

75001–75100 

|-bgcolor=#fefefe
| 75001 ||  || — || October 9, 1999 || Socorro || LINEAR || — || align=right | 2.7 km || 
|-id=002 bgcolor=#E9E9E9
| 75002 ||  || — || October 9, 1999 || Socorro || LINEAR || — || align=right | 1.7 km || 
|-id=003 bgcolor=#fefefe
| 75003 ||  || — || October 10, 1999 || Socorro || LINEAR || — || align=right | 2.5 km || 
|-id=004 bgcolor=#fefefe
| 75004 ||  || — || October 10, 1999 || Socorro || LINEAR || FLO || align=right | 1.7 km || 
|-id=005 bgcolor=#fefefe
| 75005 ||  || — || October 1, 1999 || Catalina || CSS || V || align=right | 1.4 km || 
|-id=006 bgcolor=#fefefe
| 75006 ||  || — || October 6, 1999 || Kitt Peak || Spacewatch || EUT || align=right | 1.7 km || 
|-id=007 bgcolor=#fefefe
| 75007 ||  || — || October 10, 1999 || Socorro || LINEAR || — || align=right | 2.3 km || 
|-id=008 bgcolor=#fefefe
| 75008 ||  || — || October 12, 1999 || Socorro || LINEAR || V || align=right | 1.3 km || 
|-id=009 bgcolor=#fefefe
| 75009 Petervereš || 1999 UC ||  || October 16, 1999 || Ondřejov || P. Pravec, P. Kušnirák || V || align=right data-sort-value="0.98" | 980 m || 
|-id=010 bgcolor=#fefefe
| 75010 || 1999 UP || — || October 16, 1999 || Višnjan Observatory || K. Korlević || V || align=right | 1.8 km || 
|-id=011 bgcolor=#fefefe
| 75011 ||  || — || October 17, 1999 || Oohira || T. Urata || V || align=right | 2.4 km || 
|-id=012 bgcolor=#fefefe
| 75012 ||  || — || October 17, 1999 || Višnjan Observatory || K. Korlević || V || align=right | 2.1 km || 
|-id=013 bgcolor=#fefefe
| 75013 ||  || — || October 29, 1999 || Farpoint || G. Hug, G. Bell || KLI || align=right | 3.5 km || 
|-id=014 bgcolor=#fefefe
| 75014 ||  || — || October 31, 1999 || Fountain Hills || C. W. Juels || — || align=right | 1.9 km || 
|-id=015 bgcolor=#FA8072
| 75015 ||  || — || October 29, 1999 || Kitt Peak || Spacewatch || — || align=right | 1.6 km || 
|-id=016 bgcolor=#fefefe
| 75016 ||  || — || October 29, 1999 || Catalina || CSS || NYS || align=right | 1.9 km || 
|-id=017 bgcolor=#FA8072
| 75017 ||  || — || October 29, 1999 || Socorro || LINEAR || PHO || align=right | 2.2 km || 
|-id=018 bgcolor=#E9E9E9
| 75018 ||  || — || October 29, 1999 || Socorro || LINEAR || BAR || align=right | 6.0 km || 
|-id=019 bgcolor=#fefefe
| 75019 ||  || — || October 29, 1999 || Catalina || CSS || — || align=right | 2.2 km || 
|-id=020 bgcolor=#fefefe
| 75020 ||  || — || October 29, 1999 || Catalina || CSS || — || align=right | 2.1 km || 
|-id=021 bgcolor=#fefefe
| 75021 ||  || — || October 29, 1999 || Catalina || CSS || NYS || align=right | 1.6 km || 
|-id=022 bgcolor=#fefefe
| 75022 ||  || — || October 29, 1999 || Catalina || CSS || NYS || align=right | 1.4 km || 
|-id=023 bgcolor=#fefefe
| 75023 ||  || — || October 29, 1999 || Catalina || CSS || NYS || align=right | 2.0 km || 
|-id=024 bgcolor=#fefefe
| 75024 ||  || — || October 29, 1999 || Catalina || CSS || NYS || align=right | 1.7 km || 
|-id=025 bgcolor=#fefefe
| 75025 ||  || — || October 29, 1999 || Catalina || CSS || NYS || align=right | 1.7 km || 
|-id=026 bgcolor=#fefefe
| 75026 ||  || — || October 29, 1999 || Catalina || CSS || — || align=right | 1.7 km || 
|-id=027 bgcolor=#fefefe
| 75027 ||  || — || October 29, 1999 || Kitt Peak || Spacewatch || — || align=right | 1.6 km || 
|-id=028 bgcolor=#fefefe
| 75028 ||  || — || October 30, 1999 || Kitt Peak || Spacewatch || — || align=right | 3.4 km || 
|-id=029 bgcolor=#fefefe
| 75029 ||  || — || October 31, 1999 || Kitt Peak || Spacewatch || FLO || align=right | 1.2 km || 
|-id=030 bgcolor=#fefefe
| 75030 ||  || — || October 28, 1999 || Catalina || CSS || V || align=right | 1.9 km || 
|-id=031 bgcolor=#fefefe
| 75031 ||  || — || October 28, 1999 || Catalina || CSS || — || align=right | 1.7 km || 
|-id=032 bgcolor=#fefefe
| 75032 ||  || — || October 28, 1999 || Catalina || CSS || V || align=right | 1.6 km || 
|-id=033 bgcolor=#fefefe
| 75033 ||  || — || October 28, 1999 || Catalina || CSS || FLO || align=right | 3.9 km || 
|-id=034 bgcolor=#fefefe
| 75034 ||  || — || October 30, 1999 || Catalina || CSS || — || align=right | 2.1 km || 
|-id=035 bgcolor=#fefefe
| 75035 ||  || — || October 30, 1999 || Catalina || CSS || V || align=right | 2.3 km || 
|-id=036 bgcolor=#fefefe
| 75036 ||  || — || October 30, 1999 || Catalina || CSS || — || align=right | 3.3 km || 
|-id=037 bgcolor=#E9E9E9
| 75037 ||  || — || October 30, 1999 || Kitt Peak || Spacewatch || — || align=right | 1.8 km || 
|-id=038 bgcolor=#fefefe
| 75038 ||  || — || October 31, 1999 || Kitt Peak || Spacewatch || MAS || align=right | 1.6 km || 
|-id=039 bgcolor=#fefefe
| 75039 ||  || — || October 31, 1999 || Kitt Peak || Spacewatch || — || align=right | 1.8 km || 
|-id=040 bgcolor=#fefefe
| 75040 ||  || — || October 31, 1999 || Kitt Peak || Spacewatch || — || align=right | 2.0 km || 
|-id=041 bgcolor=#fefefe
| 75041 ||  || — || October 17, 1999 || Kitt Peak || Spacewatch || — || align=right | 1.6 km || 
|-id=042 bgcolor=#fefefe
| 75042 ||  || — || October 29, 1999 || Anderson Mesa || LONEOS || — || align=right | 2.2 km || 
|-id=043 bgcolor=#fefefe
| 75043 ||  || — || October 29, 1999 || Anderson Mesa || LONEOS || V || align=right | 2.2 km || 
|-id=044 bgcolor=#fefefe
| 75044 ||  || — || October 20, 1999 || Anderson Mesa || LONEOS || — || align=right | 4.4 km || 
|-id=045 bgcolor=#fefefe
| 75045 ||  || — || October 28, 1999 || Catalina || CSS || V || align=right | 2.3 km || 
|-id=046 bgcolor=#fefefe
| 75046 ||  || — || October 28, 1999 || Catalina || CSS || — || align=right | 1.6 km || 
|-id=047 bgcolor=#fefefe
| 75047 ||  || — || October 29, 1999 || Catalina || CSS || FLO || align=right | 1.8 km || 
|-id=048 bgcolor=#fefefe
| 75048 ||  || — || October 31, 1999 || Catalina || CSS || V || align=right | 1.8 km || 
|-id=049 bgcolor=#fefefe
| 75049 ||  || — || October 29, 1999 || Anderson Mesa || LONEOS || — || align=right | 4.4 km || 
|-id=050 bgcolor=#E9E9E9
| 75050 ||  || — || October 30, 1999 || Catalina || CSS || — || align=right | 2.0 km || 
|-id=051 bgcolor=#fefefe
| 75051 ||  || — || October 30, 1999 || Catalina || CSS || — || align=right | 2.0 km || 
|-id=052 bgcolor=#fefefe
| 75052 ||  || — || October 30, 1999 || Catalina || CSS || — || align=right | 2.7 km || 
|-id=053 bgcolor=#E9E9E9
| 75053 ||  || — || October 22, 1999 || Socorro || LINEAR || — || align=right | 2.2 km || 
|-id=054 bgcolor=#fefefe
| 75054 ||  || — || October 31, 1999 || Anderson Mesa || LONEOS || FLO || align=right | 1.6 km || 
|-id=055 bgcolor=#fefefe
| 75055 ||  || — || November 4, 1999 || Nachi-Katsuura || Y. Shimizu, T. Urata || V || align=right | 2.6 km || 
|-id=056 bgcolor=#fefefe
| 75056 ||  || — || November 1, 1999 || Catalina || CSS || FLO || align=right | 1.7 km || 
|-id=057 bgcolor=#E9E9E9
| 75057 ||  || — || November 7, 1999 || Lime Creek || R. Linderholm || ADE || align=right | 4.9 km || 
|-id=058 bgcolor=#E9E9E9
| 75058 Hanau ||  ||  || November 6, 1999 || Saji || Saji Obs. || — || align=right | 1.8 km || 
|-id=059 bgcolor=#fefefe
| 75059 ||  || — || November 5, 1999 || Oizumi || T. Kobayashi || — || align=right | 5.4 km || 
|-id=060 bgcolor=#fefefe
| 75060 ||  || — || November 5, 1999 || Oizumi || T. Kobayashi || FLO || align=right | 2.7 km || 
|-id=061 bgcolor=#E9E9E9
| 75061 ||  || — || November 7, 1999 || Višnjan Observatory || K. Korlević || — || align=right | 2.3 km || 
|-id=062 bgcolor=#fefefe
| 75062 ||  || — || November 8, 1999 || Višnjan Observatory || K. Korlević || — || align=right | 2.6 km || 
|-id=063 bgcolor=#fefefe
| 75063 Koestler ||  ||  || November 1, 1999 || Gnosca || S. Sposetti || V || align=right | 2.2 km || 
|-id=064 bgcolor=#E9E9E9
| 75064 ||  || — || November 9, 1999 || Oizumi || T. Kobayashi || — || align=right | 3.9 km || 
|-id=065 bgcolor=#fefefe
| 75065 ||  || — || November 9, 1999 || Oizumi || T. Kobayashi || V || align=right | 2.0 km || 
|-id=066 bgcolor=#fefefe
| 75066 ||  || — || November 10, 1999 || Višnjan Observatory || K. Korlević || NYS || align=right | 1.7 km || 
|-id=067 bgcolor=#fefefe
| 75067 ||  || — || November 11, 1999 || Fountain Hills || C. W. Juels || — || align=right | 2.2 km || 
|-id=068 bgcolor=#E9E9E9
| 75068 ||  || — || November 2, 1999 || Socorro || LINEAR || — || align=right | 5.2 km || 
|-id=069 bgcolor=#fefefe
| 75069 ||  || — || November 2, 1999 || Kitt Peak || Spacewatch || FLO || align=right | 1.1 km || 
|-id=070 bgcolor=#fefefe
| 75070 ||  || — || November 2, 1999 || Kitt Peak || Spacewatch || FLO || align=right | 1.4 km || 
|-id=071 bgcolor=#fefefe
| 75071 ||  || — || November 11, 1999 || Farpoint || G. Bell, G. Hug || — || align=right | 2.0 km || 
|-id=072 bgcolor=#fefefe
| 75072 Timerskine ||  ||  || November 14, 1999 || Wiggins Observatory || P. Wiggins, H. Phaneuf || — || align=right | 2.9 km || 
|-id=073 bgcolor=#E9E9E9
| 75073 ||  || — || November 11, 1999 || Xinglong || SCAP || — || align=right | 3.6 km || 
|-id=074 bgcolor=#fefefe
| 75074 ||  || — || November 12, 1999 || Višnjan Observatory || K. Korlević || V || align=right | 2.7 km || 
|-id=075 bgcolor=#fefefe
| 75075 ||  || — || November 13, 1999 || Višnjan Observatory || K. Korlević || — || align=right | 4.7 km || 
|-id=076 bgcolor=#fefefe
| 75076 ||  || — || November 12, 1999 || Farpoint || G. Hug, G. Bell || — || align=right | 2.1 km || 
|-id=077 bgcolor=#fefefe
| 75077 ||  || — || November 13, 1999 || Fountain Hills || C. W. Juels || — || align=right | 2.3 km || 
|-id=078 bgcolor=#fefefe
| 75078 ||  || — || November 8, 1999 || Mallorca || R. Pacheco, Á. López J. || — || align=right | 1.9 km || 
|-id=079 bgcolor=#FA8072
| 75079 ||  || — || November 15, 1999 || Fountain Hills || C. W. Juels || PHO || align=right | 4.0 km || 
|-id=080 bgcolor=#fefefe
| 75080 ||  || — || November 12, 1999 || Kvistaberg || UDAS || — || align=right | 2.5 km || 
|-id=081 bgcolor=#fefefe
| 75081 ||  || — || November 13, 1999 || Oizumi || T. Kobayashi || — || align=right | 2.6 km || 
|-id=082 bgcolor=#fefefe
| 75082 ||  || — || November 3, 1999 || Socorro || LINEAR || NYS || align=right | 1.6 km || 
|-id=083 bgcolor=#fefefe
| 75083 ||  || — || November 3, 1999 || Socorro || LINEAR || NYS || align=right | 1.9 km || 
|-id=084 bgcolor=#fefefe
| 75084 ||  || — || November 3, 1999 || Socorro || LINEAR || NYS || align=right | 1.7 km || 
|-id=085 bgcolor=#fefefe
| 75085 ||  || — || November 3, 1999 || Socorro || LINEAR || — || align=right | 4.2 km || 
|-id=086 bgcolor=#fefefe
| 75086 ||  || — || November 3, 1999 || Socorro || LINEAR || MAS || align=right | 1.5 km || 
|-id=087 bgcolor=#fefefe
| 75087 ||  || — || November 3, 1999 || Socorro || LINEAR || V || align=right | 1.5 km || 
|-id=088 bgcolor=#fefefe
| 75088 ||  || — || November 3, 1999 || Socorro || LINEAR || MAS || align=right | 2.5 km || 
|-id=089 bgcolor=#fefefe
| 75089 ||  || — || November 3, 1999 || Socorro || LINEAR || ERI || align=right | 4.6 km || 
|-id=090 bgcolor=#fefefe
| 75090 ||  || — || November 3, 1999 || Socorro || LINEAR || — || align=right | 3.5 km || 
|-id=091 bgcolor=#E9E9E9
| 75091 ||  || — || November 3, 1999 || Socorro || LINEAR || — || align=right | 3.2 km || 
|-id=092 bgcolor=#fefefe
| 75092 ||  || — || November 3, 1999 || Socorro || LINEAR || V || align=right | 1.3 km || 
|-id=093 bgcolor=#fefefe
| 75093 ||  || — || November 3, 1999 || Socorro || LINEAR || — || align=right | 3.0 km || 
|-id=094 bgcolor=#fefefe
| 75094 ||  || — || November 3, 1999 || Socorro || LINEAR || — || align=right | 2.8 km || 
|-id=095 bgcolor=#fefefe
| 75095 ||  || — || November 3, 1999 || Socorro || LINEAR || V || align=right | 2.0 km || 
|-id=096 bgcolor=#fefefe
| 75096 ||  || — || November 3, 1999 || Socorro || LINEAR || — || align=right | 3.9 km || 
|-id=097 bgcolor=#E9E9E9
| 75097 ||  || — || November 3, 1999 || Socorro || LINEAR || — || align=right | 3.9 km || 
|-id=098 bgcolor=#fefefe
| 75098 ||  || — || November 10, 1999 || Socorro || LINEAR || NYS || align=right | 1.4 km || 
|-id=099 bgcolor=#fefefe
| 75099 ||  || — || November 1, 1999 || Kitt Peak || Spacewatch || NYS || align=right data-sort-value="0.96" | 960 m || 
|-id=100 bgcolor=#fefefe
| 75100 ||  || — || November 4, 1999 || Kitt Peak || Spacewatch || — || align=right | 2.0 km || 
|}

75101–75200 

|-bgcolor=#fefefe
| 75101 ||  || — || November 4, 1999 || Catalina || CSS || V || align=right | 1.6 km || 
|-id=102 bgcolor=#fefefe
| 75102 ||  || — || November 4, 1999 || Socorro || LINEAR || — || align=right | 2.3 km || 
|-id=103 bgcolor=#fefefe
| 75103 ||  || — || November 3, 1999 || Socorro || LINEAR || — || align=right | 3.0 km || 
|-id=104 bgcolor=#fefefe
| 75104 ||  || — || November 3, 1999 || Socorro || LINEAR || — || align=right | 2.9 km || 
|-id=105 bgcolor=#fefefe
| 75105 ||  || — || November 3, 1999 || Socorro || LINEAR || — || align=right | 1.8 km || 
|-id=106 bgcolor=#E9E9E9
| 75106 ||  || — || November 3, 1999 || Socorro || LINEAR || — || align=right | 2.8 km || 
|-id=107 bgcolor=#fefefe
| 75107 ||  || — || November 4, 1999 || Socorro || LINEAR || — || align=right | 3.4 km || 
|-id=108 bgcolor=#fefefe
| 75108 ||  || — || November 4, 1999 || Socorro || LINEAR || NYS || align=right | 1.8 km || 
|-id=109 bgcolor=#fefefe
| 75109 ||  || — || November 4, 1999 || Socorro || LINEAR || EUT || align=right | 1.5 km || 
|-id=110 bgcolor=#fefefe
| 75110 ||  || — || November 4, 1999 || Socorro || LINEAR || V || align=right | 2.2 km || 
|-id=111 bgcolor=#fefefe
| 75111 ||  || — || November 4, 1999 || Socorro || LINEAR || — || align=right | 1.7 km || 
|-id=112 bgcolor=#fefefe
| 75112 ||  || — || November 4, 1999 || Socorro || LINEAR || V || align=right | 3.9 km || 
|-id=113 bgcolor=#fefefe
| 75113 ||  || — || November 4, 1999 || Socorro || LINEAR || FLO || align=right | 2.0 km || 
|-id=114 bgcolor=#fefefe
| 75114 ||  || — || November 4, 1999 || Socorro || LINEAR || FLO || align=right | 4.9 km || 
|-id=115 bgcolor=#fefefe
| 75115 ||  || — || November 4, 1999 || Socorro || LINEAR || — || align=right | 1.8 km || 
|-id=116 bgcolor=#fefefe
| 75116 ||  || — || November 4, 1999 || Socorro || LINEAR || — || align=right | 1.7 km || 
|-id=117 bgcolor=#fefefe
| 75117 ||  || — || November 4, 1999 || Socorro || LINEAR || — || align=right | 1.9 km || 
|-id=118 bgcolor=#fefefe
| 75118 ||  || — || November 4, 1999 || Socorro || LINEAR || — || align=right | 2.0 km || 
|-id=119 bgcolor=#fefefe
| 75119 ||  || — || November 4, 1999 || Socorro || LINEAR || V || align=right | 1.5 km || 
|-id=120 bgcolor=#fefefe
| 75120 ||  || — || November 4, 1999 || Socorro || LINEAR || V || align=right | 1.9 km || 
|-id=121 bgcolor=#fefefe
| 75121 ||  || — || November 4, 1999 || Socorro || LINEAR || — || align=right | 2.4 km || 
|-id=122 bgcolor=#fefefe
| 75122 ||  || — || November 4, 1999 || Socorro || LINEAR || — || align=right | 1.5 km || 
|-id=123 bgcolor=#fefefe
| 75123 ||  || — || November 4, 1999 || Socorro || LINEAR || NYS || align=right | 1.9 km || 
|-id=124 bgcolor=#E9E9E9
| 75124 ||  || — || November 4, 1999 || Socorro || LINEAR || — || align=right | 2.8 km || 
|-id=125 bgcolor=#fefefe
| 75125 ||  || — || November 4, 1999 || Socorro || LINEAR || — || align=right | 1.9 km || 
|-id=126 bgcolor=#E9E9E9
| 75126 ||  || — || November 4, 1999 || Socorro || LINEAR || GER || align=right | 3.2 km || 
|-id=127 bgcolor=#fefefe
| 75127 ||  || — || November 4, 1999 || Socorro || LINEAR || V || align=right | 1.6 km || 
|-id=128 bgcolor=#E9E9E9
| 75128 ||  || — || November 4, 1999 || Socorro || LINEAR || — || align=right | 3.9 km || 
|-id=129 bgcolor=#fefefe
| 75129 ||  || — || November 4, 1999 || Socorro || LINEAR || MAS || align=right | 4.1 km || 
|-id=130 bgcolor=#E9E9E9
| 75130 ||  || — || November 4, 1999 || Socorro || LINEAR || — || align=right | 4.0 km || 
|-id=131 bgcolor=#fefefe
| 75131 ||  || — || November 4, 1999 || Socorro || LINEAR || NYS || align=right | 4.4 km || 
|-id=132 bgcolor=#E9E9E9
| 75132 ||  || — || November 4, 1999 || Socorro || LINEAR || — || align=right | 2.0 km || 
|-id=133 bgcolor=#fefefe
| 75133 ||  || — || November 5, 1999 || Kitt Peak || Spacewatch || NYS || align=right | 1.4 km || 
|-id=134 bgcolor=#fefefe
| 75134 ||  || — || November 3, 1999 || Socorro || LINEAR || — || align=right | 2.0 km || 
|-id=135 bgcolor=#fefefe
| 75135 ||  || — || November 3, 1999 || Socorro || LINEAR || — || align=right | 2.0 km || 
|-id=136 bgcolor=#fefefe
| 75136 ||  || — || November 4, 1999 || Socorro || LINEAR || — || align=right | 1.8 km || 
|-id=137 bgcolor=#fefefe
| 75137 ||  || — || November 4, 1999 || Socorro || LINEAR || NYS || align=right | 1.4 km || 
|-id=138 bgcolor=#fefefe
| 75138 ||  || — || November 4, 1999 || Socorro || LINEAR || V || align=right | 1.8 km || 
|-id=139 bgcolor=#fefefe
| 75139 ||  || — || November 1, 1999 || Kitt Peak || Spacewatch || — || align=right | 3.5 km || 
|-id=140 bgcolor=#fefefe
| 75140 ||  || — || November 2, 1999 || Kitt Peak || Spacewatch || — || align=right | 1.5 km || 
|-id=141 bgcolor=#fefefe
| 75141 ||  || — || November 6, 1999 || Kitt Peak || Spacewatch || — || align=right | 1.3 km || 
|-id=142 bgcolor=#fefefe
| 75142 ||  || — || November 5, 1999 || Socorro || LINEAR || FLO || align=right | 1.3 km || 
|-id=143 bgcolor=#fefefe
| 75143 ||  || — || November 5, 1999 || Socorro || LINEAR || — || align=right | 2.5 km || 
|-id=144 bgcolor=#fefefe
| 75144 ||  || — || November 5, 1999 || Socorro || LINEAR || — || align=right | 2.1 km || 
|-id=145 bgcolor=#fefefe
| 75145 ||  || — || November 9, 1999 || Socorro || LINEAR || — || align=right | 2.0 km || 
|-id=146 bgcolor=#fefefe
| 75146 ||  || — || November 9, 1999 || Socorro || LINEAR || — || align=right | 2.0 km || 
|-id=147 bgcolor=#fefefe
| 75147 ||  || — || November 9, 1999 || Socorro || LINEAR || — || align=right | 1.4 km || 
|-id=148 bgcolor=#fefefe
| 75148 ||  || — || November 9, 1999 || Socorro || LINEAR || NYS || align=right | 3.8 km || 
|-id=149 bgcolor=#fefefe
| 75149 ||  || — || November 9, 1999 || Socorro || LINEAR || — || align=right | 1.5 km || 
|-id=150 bgcolor=#fefefe
| 75150 ||  || — || November 9, 1999 || Socorro || LINEAR || — || align=right | 2.1 km || 
|-id=151 bgcolor=#fefefe
| 75151 ||  || — || November 9, 1999 || Socorro || LINEAR || MAS || align=right | 2.2 km || 
|-id=152 bgcolor=#fefefe
| 75152 ||  || — || November 9, 1999 || Socorro || LINEAR || fast? || align=right | 1.6 km || 
|-id=153 bgcolor=#fefefe
| 75153 ||  || — || November 9, 1999 || Socorro || LINEAR || FLO || align=right | 1.4 km || 
|-id=154 bgcolor=#fefefe
| 75154 ||  || — || November 9, 1999 || Socorro || LINEAR || — || align=right | 1.6 km || 
|-id=155 bgcolor=#fefefe
| 75155 ||  || — || November 9, 1999 || Socorro || LINEAR || MAS || align=right | 1.4 km || 
|-id=156 bgcolor=#fefefe
| 75156 ||  || — || November 9, 1999 || Socorro || LINEAR || — || align=right | 1.8 km || 
|-id=157 bgcolor=#fefefe
| 75157 ||  || — || November 9, 1999 || Socorro || LINEAR || MAS || align=right | 1.3 km || 
|-id=158 bgcolor=#E9E9E9
| 75158 ||  || — || November 9, 1999 || Socorro || LINEAR || MAR || align=right | 2.5 km || 
|-id=159 bgcolor=#E9E9E9
| 75159 ||  || — || November 9, 1999 || Socorro || LINEAR || — || align=right | 2.6 km || 
|-id=160 bgcolor=#fefefe
| 75160 ||  || — || November 9, 1999 || Catalina || CSS || V || align=right | 1.4 km || 
|-id=161 bgcolor=#E9E9E9
| 75161 ||  || — || November 9, 1999 || Catalina || CSS || EUN || align=right | 2.3 km || 
|-id=162 bgcolor=#E9E9E9
| 75162 ||  || — || November 4, 1999 || Kitt Peak || Spacewatch || — || align=right | 2.7 km || 
|-id=163 bgcolor=#fefefe
| 75163 ||  || — || November 3, 1999 || Kitt Peak || Spacewatch || — || align=right | 1.6 km || 
|-id=164 bgcolor=#fefefe
| 75164 ||  || — || November 3, 1999 || Kitt Peak || Spacewatch || NYS || align=right | 4.1 km || 
|-id=165 bgcolor=#E9E9E9
| 75165 ||  || — || November 4, 1999 || Kitt Peak || Spacewatch || — || align=right | 2.4 km || 
|-id=166 bgcolor=#fefefe
| 75166 ||  || — || November 6, 1999 || Kitt Peak || Spacewatch || V || align=right | 1.5 km || 
|-id=167 bgcolor=#fefefe
| 75167 ||  || — || November 9, 1999 || Kitt Peak || Spacewatch || — || align=right | 1.8 km || 
|-id=168 bgcolor=#fefefe
| 75168 ||  || — || November 11, 1999 || Kitt Peak || Spacewatch || ERI || align=right | 4.0 km || 
|-id=169 bgcolor=#fefefe
| 75169 ||  || — || November 8, 1999 || Socorro || LINEAR || — || align=right | 1.8 km || 
|-id=170 bgcolor=#fefefe
| 75170 ||  || — || November 9, 1999 || Catalina || CSS || V || align=right | 1.7 km || 
|-id=171 bgcolor=#fefefe
| 75171 ||  || — || November 13, 1999 || Kitt Peak || Spacewatch || — || align=right | 1.7 km || 
|-id=172 bgcolor=#fefefe
| 75172 ||  || — || November 13, 1999 || Catalina || CSS || — || align=right | 5.7 km || 
|-id=173 bgcolor=#fefefe
| 75173 ||  || — || November 14, 1999 || Socorro || LINEAR || V || align=right | 1.6 km || 
|-id=174 bgcolor=#E9E9E9
| 75174 ||  || — || November 14, 1999 || Socorro || LINEAR || — || align=right | 2.0 km || 
|-id=175 bgcolor=#fefefe
| 75175 ||  || — || November 9, 1999 || Kitt Peak || Spacewatch || V || align=right | 1.4 km || 
|-id=176 bgcolor=#d6d6d6
| 75176 ||  || — || November 9, 1999 || Socorro || LINEAR || KAR || align=right | 2.0 km || 
|-id=177 bgcolor=#E9E9E9
| 75177 ||  || — || November 12, 1999 || Socorro || LINEAR || — || align=right | 3.0 km || 
|-id=178 bgcolor=#fefefe
| 75178 ||  || — || November 14, 1999 || Socorro || LINEAR || — || align=right | 3.3 km || 
|-id=179 bgcolor=#fefefe
| 75179 ||  || — || November 14, 1999 || Socorro || LINEAR || — || align=right | 4.5 km || 
|-id=180 bgcolor=#E9E9E9
| 75180 ||  || — || November 14, 1999 || Socorro || LINEAR || — || align=right | 1.6 km || 
|-id=181 bgcolor=#fefefe
| 75181 ||  || — || November 14, 1999 || Socorro || LINEAR || FLO || align=right | 1.8 km || 
|-id=182 bgcolor=#fefefe
| 75182 ||  || — || November 14, 1999 || Socorro || LINEAR || NYS || align=right | 1.5 km || 
|-id=183 bgcolor=#fefefe
| 75183 ||  || — || November 14, 1999 || Socorro || LINEAR || MAS || align=right | 1.6 km || 
|-id=184 bgcolor=#fefefe
| 75184 ||  || — || November 14, 1999 || Socorro || LINEAR || NYS || align=right | 1.6 km || 
|-id=185 bgcolor=#fefefe
| 75185 ||  || — || November 14, 1999 || Socorro || LINEAR || — || align=right | 2.0 km || 
|-id=186 bgcolor=#fefefe
| 75186 ||  || — || November 14, 1999 || Socorro || LINEAR || NYS || align=right | 1.6 km || 
|-id=187 bgcolor=#fefefe
| 75187 ||  || — || November 14, 1999 || Socorro || LINEAR || — || align=right | 1.6 km || 
|-id=188 bgcolor=#fefefe
| 75188 ||  || — || November 14, 1999 || Socorro || LINEAR || — || align=right | 2.0 km || 
|-id=189 bgcolor=#fefefe
| 75189 ||  || — || November 14, 1999 || Socorro || LINEAR || NYS || align=right | 1.3 km || 
|-id=190 bgcolor=#fefefe
| 75190 Segreliliana ||  ||  || November 14, 1999 || Socorro || LINEAR || MAS || align=right | 1.5 km || 
|-id=191 bgcolor=#fefefe
| 75191 ||  || — || November 14, 1999 || Socorro || LINEAR || NYS || align=right | 1.4 km || 
|-id=192 bgcolor=#fefefe
| 75192 ||  || — || November 14, 1999 || Socorro || LINEAR || NYS || align=right | 1.6 km || 
|-id=193 bgcolor=#fefefe
| 75193 ||  || — || November 14, 1999 || Socorro || LINEAR || — || align=right | 2.2 km || 
|-id=194 bgcolor=#fefefe
| 75194 ||  || — || November 14, 1999 || Socorro || LINEAR || — || align=right | 2.1 km || 
|-id=195 bgcolor=#fefefe
| 75195 ||  || — || November 15, 1999 || Socorro || LINEAR || — || align=right | 1.9 km || 
|-id=196 bgcolor=#fefefe
| 75196 ||  || — || November 15, 1999 || Socorro || LINEAR || — || align=right | 4.1 km || 
|-id=197 bgcolor=#E9E9E9
| 75197 ||  || — || November 15, 1999 || Socorro || LINEAR || — || align=right | 1.9 km || 
|-id=198 bgcolor=#fefefe
| 75198 ||  || — || November 15, 1999 || Socorro || LINEAR || MAS || align=right | 1.2 km || 
|-id=199 bgcolor=#fefefe
| 75199 ||  || — || November 4, 1999 || Socorro || LINEAR || — || align=right | 1.6 km || 
|-id=200 bgcolor=#fefefe
| 75200 ||  || — || November 5, 1999 || Socorro || LINEAR || — || align=right | 2.3 km || 
|}

75201–75300 

|-bgcolor=#fefefe
| 75201 ||  || — || November 6, 1999 || Socorro || LINEAR || — || align=right | 2.1 km || 
|-id=202 bgcolor=#fefefe
| 75202 ||  || — || November 6, 1999 || Socorro || LINEAR || — || align=right | 2.2 km || 
|-id=203 bgcolor=#fefefe
| 75203 ||  || — || November 12, 1999 || Socorro || LINEAR || FLO || align=right | 2.0 km || 
|-id=204 bgcolor=#d6d6d6
| 75204 ||  || — || November 15, 1999 || Socorro || LINEAR || KOR || align=right | 2.8 km || 
|-id=205 bgcolor=#fefefe
| 75205 ||  || — || November 15, 1999 || Socorro || LINEAR || FLO || align=right | 1.6 km || 
|-id=206 bgcolor=#fefefe
| 75206 ||  || — || November 15, 1999 || Socorro || LINEAR || — || align=right | 2.4 km || 
|-id=207 bgcolor=#E9E9E9
| 75207 ||  || — || November 15, 1999 || Socorro || LINEAR || — || align=right | 3.6 km || 
|-id=208 bgcolor=#fefefe
| 75208 ||  || — || November 9, 1999 || Socorro || LINEAR || FLO || align=right | 1.2 km || 
|-id=209 bgcolor=#fefefe
| 75209 ||  || — || November 1, 1999 || Anderson Mesa || LONEOS || — || align=right | 2.3 km || 
|-id=210 bgcolor=#fefefe
| 75210 ||  || — || November 1, 1999 || Anderson Mesa || LONEOS || V || align=right | 1.3 km || 
|-id=211 bgcolor=#fefefe
| 75211 ||  || — || November 1, 1999 || Anderson Mesa || LONEOS || — || align=right | 2.1 km || 
|-id=212 bgcolor=#fefefe
| 75212 ||  || — || November 3, 1999 || Socorro || LINEAR || — || align=right | 1.9 km || 
|-id=213 bgcolor=#fefefe
| 75213 ||  || — || November 4, 1999 || Socorro || LINEAR || V || align=right | 1.4 km || 
|-id=214 bgcolor=#fefefe
| 75214 ||  || — || November 4, 1999 || Socorro || LINEAR || — || align=right | 1.9 km || 
|-id=215 bgcolor=#fefefe
| 75215 ||  || — || November 12, 1999 || Socorro || LINEAR || FLO || align=right | 1.1 km || 
|-id=216 bgcolor=#fefefe
| 75216 ||  || — || November 14, 1999 || Socorro || LINEAR || NYS || align=right | 1.6 km || 
|-id=217 bgcolor=#fefefe
| 75217 ||  || — || November 3, 1999 || Socorro || LINEAR || — || align=right | 2.1 km || 
|-id=218 bgcolor=#fefefe
| 75218 ||  || — || November 3, 1999 || Socorro || LINEAR || FLO || align=right | 2.0 km || 
|-id=219 bgcolor=#fefefe
| 75219 ||  || — || November 5, 1999 || Socorro || LINEAR || — || align=right | 2.9 km || 
|-id=220 bgcolor=#E9E9E9
| 75220 ||  || — || November 3, 1999 || Socorro || LINEAR || — || align=right | 2.1 km || 
|-id=221 bgcolor=#fefefe
| 75221 ||  || — || November 4, 1999 || Kitt Peak || Spacewatch || — || align=right | 1.1 km || 
|-id=222 bgcolor=#E9E9E9
| 75222 ||  || — || November 5, 1999 || Socorro || LINEAR || RAF || align=right | 1.8 km || 
|-id=223 bgcolor=#fefefe
| 75223 Wupatki ||  ||  || November 28, 1999 || Kleť || M. Tichý, J. Tichá || NYS || align=right | 2.7 km || 
|-id=224 bgcolor=#fefefe
| 75224 ||  || — || November 27, 1999 || Višnjan Observatory || K. Korlević || NYS || align=right | 2.2 km || 
|-id=225 bgcolor=#E9E9E9
| 75225 Corradoaugias ||  ||  || November 27, 1999 || Colleverde || V. S. Casulli || — || align=right | 3.2 km || 
|-id=226 bgcolor=#fefefe
| 75226 ||  || — || November 19, 1999 || Kvistaberg || UDAS || NYS || align=right | 1.2 km || 
|-id=227 bgcolor=#fefefe
| 75227 ||  || — || November 28, 1999 || Oizumi || T. Kobayashi || V || align=right | 2.0 km || 
|-id=228 bgcolor=#fefefe
| 75228 ||  || — || November 28, 1999 || Oizumi || T. Kobayashi || — || align=right | 1.9 km || 
|-id=229 bgcolor=#E9E9E9
| 75229 ||  || — || November 28, 1999 || Oizumi || T. Kobayashi || — || align=right | 2.4 km || 
|-id=230 bgcolor=#E9E9E9
| 75230 ||  || — || November 28, 1999 || Oizumi || T. Kobayashi || — || align=right | 2.8 km || 
|-id=231 bgcolor=#E9E9E9
| 75231 ||  || — || November 28, 1999 || Oizumi || T. Kobayashi || — || align=right | 3.6 km || 
|-id=232 bgcolor=#fefefe
| 75232 ||  || — || November 28, 1999 || Višnjan Observatory || K. Korlević || — || align=right | 2.5 km || 
|-id=233 bgcolor=#fefefe
| 75233 ||  || — || November 28, 1999 || Višnjan Observatory || K. Korlević || — || align=right | 2.2 km || 
|-id=234 bgcolor=#fefefe
| 75234 ||  || — || November 28, 1999 || Višnjan Observatory || K. Korlević || — || align=right | 1.8 km || 
|-id=235 bgcolor=#fefefe
| 75235 ||  || — || November 29, 1999 || Višnjan Observatory || K. Korlević || — || align=right | 2.7 km || 
|-id=236 bgcolor=#fefefe
| 75236 ||  || — || November 28, 1999 || Kvistaberg || UDAS || — || align=right | 5.4 km || 
|-id=237 bgcolor=#fefefe
| 75237 ||  || — || November 29, 1999 || Oohira || T. Urata || — || align=right | 5.7 km || 
|-id=238 bgcolor=#fefefe
| 75238 ||  || — || November 29, 1999 || San Marcello || A. Boattini, L. Tesi || — || align=right | 1.9 km || 
|-id=239 bgcolor=#E9E9E9
| 75239 ||  || — || November 30, 1999 || Oizumi || T. Kobayashi || — || align=right | 3.0 km || 
|-id=240 bgcolor=#fefefe
| 75240 ||  || — || November 30, 1999 || Kitt Peak || Spacewatch || KLI || align=right | 6.4 km || 
|-id=241 bgcolor=#E9E9E9
| 75241 ||  || — || November 29, 1999 || Nachi-Katsuura || H. Shiozawa, T. Urata || — || align=right | 5.6 km || 
|-id=242 bgcolor=#fefefe
| 75242 ||  || — || November 29, 1999 || Nachi-Katsuura || H. Shiozawa, T. Urata || FLO || align=right | 3.0 km || 
|-id=243 bgcolor=#fefefe
| 75243 ||  || — || November 28, 1999 || Kitt Peak || Spacewatch || — || align=right | 1.6 km || 
|-id=244 bgcolor=#fefefe
| 75244 ||  || — || November 29, 1999 || Kitt Peak || Spacewatch || — || align=right | 2.1 km || 
|-id=245 bgcolor=#fefefe
| 75245 ||  || — || November 29, 1999 || Višnjan Observatory || K. Korlević || — || align=right | 3.8 km || 
|-id=246 bgcolor=#fefefe
| 75246 ||  || — || November 30, 1999 || Kitt Peak || Spacewatch || — || align=right | 1.8 km || 
|-id=247 bgcolor=#E9E9E9
| 75247 || 1999 XJ || — || December 1, 1999 || Prescott || P. G. Comba || — || align=right | 1.6 km || 
|-id=248 bgcolor=#fefefe
| 75248 || 1999 XX || — || December 2, 1999 || Oizumi || T. Kobayashi || NYS || align=right | 3.5 km || 
|-id=249 bgcolor=#fefefe
| 75249 ||  || — || December 3, 1999 || Baton Rouge || W. R. Cooney Jr. || — || align=right | 2.0 km || 
|-id=250 bgcolor=#fefefe
| 75250 ||  || — || December 4, 1999 || Catalina || CSS || — || align=right | 2.3 km || 
|-id=251 bgcolor=#fefefe
| 75251 ||  || — || December 4, 1999 || Catalina || CSS || — || align=right | 3.2 km || 
|-id=252 bgcolor=#fefefe
| 75252 ||  || — || December 4, 1999 || Catalina || CSS || — || align=right | 5.0 km || 
|-id=253 bgcolor=#E9E9E9
| 75253 ||  || — || December 4, 1999 || Catalina || CSS || — || align=right | 4.6 km || 
|-id=254 bgcolor=#fefefe
| 75254 ||  || — || December 4, 1999 || Catalina || CSS || V || align=right | 1.9 km || 
|-id=255 bgcolor=#fefefe
| 75255 ||  || — || December 4, 1999 || Catalina || CSS || — || align=right | 3.0 km || 
|-id=256 bgcolor=#E9E9E9
| 75256 ||  || — || December 4, 1999 || Catalina || CSS || — || align=right | 2.7 km || 
|-id=257 bgcolor=#fefefe
| 75257 ||  || — || December 4, 1999 || Catalina || CSS || NYS || align=right | 1.6 km || 
|-id=258 bgcolor=#fefefe
| 75258 ||  || — || December 3, 1999 || Oizumi || T. Kobayashi || NYS || align=right | 1.9 km || 
|-id=259 bgcolor=#fefefe
| 75259 ||  || — || December 2, 1999 || Kitt Peak || Spacewatch || — || align=right | 2.2 km || 
|-id=260 bgcolor=#fefefe
| 75260 ||  || — || December 5, 1999 || Catalina || CSS || V || align=right | 1.9 km || 
|-id=261 bgcolor=#fefefe
| 75261 ||  || — || December 5, 1999 || Catalina || CSS || V || align=right | 1.4 km || 
|-id=262 bgcolor=#E9E9E9
| 75262 ||  || — || December 5, 1999 || Catalina || CSS || — || align=right | 2.0 km || 
|-id=263 bgcolor=#fefefe
| 75263 ||  || — || December 5, 1999 || Catalina || CSS || — || align=right | 2.7 km || 
|-id=264 bgcolor=#fefefe
| 75264 ||  || — || December 5, 1999 || Socorro || LINEAR || — || align=right | 2.0 km || 
|-id=265 bgcolor=#fefefe
| 75265 ||  || — || December 5, 1999 || Socorro || LINEAR || — || align=right | 2.0 km || 
|-id=266 bgcolor=#fefefe
| 75266 ||  || — || December 5, 1999 || Socorro || LINEAR || — || align=right | 2.3 km || 
|-id=267 bgcolor=#fefefe
| 75267 ||  || — || December 5, 1999 || Socorro || LINEAR || — || align=right | 2.4 km || 
|-id=268 bgcolor=#fefefe
| 75268 ||  || — || December 5, 1999 || Višnjan Observatory || K. Korlević || — || align=right | 4.1 km || 
|-id=269 bgcolor=#E9E9E9
| 75269 ||  || — || December 6, 1999 || Višnjan Observatory || K. Korlević || — || align=right | 5.6 km || 
|-id=270 bgcolor=#fefefe
| 75270 ||  || — || December 7, 1999 || Catalina || CSS || — || align=right | 5.6 km || 
|-id=271 bgcolor=#fefefe
| 75271 ||  || — || December 7, 1999 || Prescott || P. G. Comba || — || align=right | 2.6 km || 
|-id=272 bgcolor=#E9E9E9
| 75272 ||  || — || December 7, 1999 || Socorro || LINEAR || — || align=right | 4.5 km || 
|-id=273 bgcolor=#fefefe
| 75273 ||  || — || December 3, 1999 || Socorro || LINEAR || FLO || align=right | 2.7 km || 
|-id=274 bgcolor=#fefefe
| 75274 ||  || — || December 3, 1999 || Socorro || LINEAR || — || align=right | 2.0 km || 
|-id=275 bgcolor=#fefefe
| 75275 ||  || — || December 3, 1999 || Socorro || LINEAR || FLO || align=right | 2.9 km || 
|-id=276 bgcolor=#fefefe
| 75276 ||  || — || December 3, 1999 || Socorro || LINEAR || EUT || align=right | 1.7 km || 
|-id=277 bgcolor=#fefefe
| 75277 ||  || — || December 5, 1999 || Socorro || LINEAR || V || align=right | 2.0 km || 
|-id=278 bgcolor=#fefefe
| 75278 ||  || — || December 5, 1999 || Socorro || LINEAR || — || align=right | 2.2 km || 
|-id=279 bgcolor=#fefefe
| 75279 ||  || — || December 5, 1999 || Socorro || LINEAR || — || align=right | 1.8 km || 
|-id=280 bgcolor=#fefefe
| 75280 ||  || — || December 5, 1999 || Socorro || LINEAR || — || align=right | 2.0 km || 
|-id=281 bgcolor=#E9E9E9
| 75281 ||  || — || December 5, 1999 || Socorro || LINEAR || — || align=right | 3.9 km || 
|-id=282 bgcolor=#fefefe
| 75282 ||  || — || December 6, 1999 || Socorro || LINEAR || — || align=right | 1.7 km || 
|-id=283 bgcolor=#fefefe
| 75283 ||  || — || December 6, 1999 || Socorro || LINEAR || — || align=right | 1.7 km || 
|-id=284 bgcolor=#fefefe
| 75284 ||  || — || December 6, 1999 || Socorro || LINEAR || FLO || align=right | 1.8 km || 
|-id=285 bgcolor=#fefefe
| 75285 ||  || — || December 6, 1999 || Socorro || LINEAR || PHO || align=right | 3.8 km || 
|-id=286 bgcolor=#fefefe
| 75286 ||  || — || December 6, 1999 || Socorro || LINEAR || — || align=right | 4.3 km || 
|-id=287 bgcolor=#fefefe
| 75287 ||  || — || December 6, 1999 || Socorro || LINEAR || NYS || align=right | 1.9 km || 
|-id=288 bgcolor=#fefefe
| 75288 ||  || — || December 6, 1999 || Socorro || LINEAR || V || align=right | 1.7 km || 
|-id=289 bgcolor=#fefefe
| 75289 ||  || — || December 6, 1999 || Socorro || LINEAR || — || align=right | 2.0 km || 
|-id=290 bgcolor=#fefefe
| 75290 ||  || — || December 6, 1999 || Socorro || LINEAR || — || align=right | 2.4 km || 
|-id=291 bgcolor=#E9E9E9
| 75291 ||  || — || December 6, 1999 || Socorro || LINEAR || — || align=right | 4.9 km || 
|-id=292 bgcolor=#fefefe
| 75292 ||  || — || December 6, 1999 || Socorro || LINEAR || — || align=right | 2.3 km || 
|-id=293 bgcolor=#fefefe
| 75293 ||  || — || December 6, 1999 || Socorro || LINEAR || — || align=right | 2.5 km || 
|-id=294 bgcolor=#fefefe
| 75294 ||  || — || December 6, 1999 || Socorro || LINEAR || — || align=right | 3.5 km || 
|-id=295 bgcolor=#fefefe
| 75295 ||  || — || December 6, 1999 || Socorro || LINEAR || V || align=right | 1.4 km || 
|-id=296 bgcolor=#fefefe
| 75296 ||  || — || December 6, 1999 || Socorro || LINEAR || — || align=right | 2.2 km || 
|-id=297 bgcolor=#E9E9E9
| 75297 ||  || — || December 6, 1999 || Socorro || LINEAR || — || align=right | 8.0 km || 
|-id=298 bgcolor=#E9E9E9
| 75298 ||  || — || December 6, 1999 || Socorro || LINEAR || — || align=right | 5.6 km || 
|-id=299 bgcolor=#E9E9E9
| 75299 ||  || — || December 6, 1999 || Socorro || LINEAR || — || align=right | 2.3 km || 
|-id=300 bgcolor=#E9E9E9
| 75300 ||  || — || December 6, 1999 || Socorro || LINEAR || — || align=right | 5.3 km || 
|}

75301–75400 

|-bgcolor=#d6d6d6
| 75301 ||  || — || December 6, 1999 || Socorro || LINEAR || — || align=right | 12 km || 
|-id=302 bgcolor=#fefefe
| 75302 ||  || — || December 6, 1999 || Socorro || LINEAR || V || align=right | 2.2 km || 
|-id=303 bgcolor=#FA8072
| 75303 ||  || — || December 6, 1999 || Catalina || CSS || — || align=right | 3.8 km || 
|-id=304 bgcolor=#E9E9E9
| 75304 ||  || — || December 7, 1999 || Fountain Hills || C. W. Juels || — || align=right | 4.2 km || 
|-id=305 bgcolor=#fefefe
| 75305 ||  || — || December 7, 1999 || Fountain Hills || C. W. Juels || V || align=right | 2.3 km || 
|-id=306 bgcolor=#fefefe
| 75306 ||  || — || December 7, 1999 || Oaxaca || J. M. Roe || NYS || align=right | 3.9 km || 
|-id=307 bgcolor=#fefefe
| 75307 ||  || — || December 7, 1999 || Fountain Hills || C. W. Juels || V || align=right | 2.2 km || 
|-id=308 bgcolor=#fefefe
| 75308 Shoin ||  ||  || December 7, 1999 || Kuma Kogen || A. Nakamura || — || align=right | 3.0 km || 
|-id=309 bgcolor=#fefefe
| 75309 ||  || — || December 3, 1999 || Nachi-Katsuura || Y. Shimizu, T. Urata || — || align=right | 2.2 km || 
|-id=310 bgcolor=#E9E9E9
| 75310 ||  || — || December 5, 1999 || Socorro || LINEAR || — || align=right | 5.8 km || 
|-id=311 bgcolor=#E9E9E9
| 75311 ||  || — || December 6, 1999 || Socorro || LINEAR || — || align=right | 5.8 km || 
|-id=312 bgcolor=#fefefe
| 75312 ||  || — || December 7, 1999 || Socorro || LINEAR || — || align=right | 2.2 km || 
|-id=313 bgcolor=#E9E9E9
| 75313 ||  || — || December 7, 1999 || Socorro || LINEAR || — || align=right | 2.5 km || 
|-id=314 bgcolor=#fefefe
| 75314 ||  || — || December 7, 1999 || Socorro || LINEAR || — || align=right | 2.5 km || 
|-id=315 bgcolor=#fefefe
| 75315 ||  || — || December 7, 1999 || Socorro || LINEAR || V || align=right | 1.8 km || 
|-id=316 bgcolor=#fefefe
| 75316 ||  || — || December 7, 1999 || Socorro || LINEAR || FLO || align=right | 1.6 km || 
|-id=317 bgcolor=#fefefe
| 75317 ||  || — || December 7, 1999 || Socorro || LINEAR || NYS || align=right | 1.7 km || 
|-id=318 bgcolor=#fefefe
| 75318 ||  || — || December 7, 1999 || Socorro || LINEAR || — || align=right | 1.7 km || 
|-id=319 bgcolor=#fefefe
| 75319 ||  || — || December 7, 1999 || Socorro || LINEAR || FLO || align=right | 1.9 km || 
|-id=320 bgcolor=#fefefe
| 75320 ||  || — || December 7, 1999 || Socorro || LINEAR || V || align=right | 1.4 km || 
|-id=321 bgcolor=#fefefe
| 75321 ||  || — || December 7, 1999 || Socorro || LINEAR || — || align=right | 1.9 km || 
|-id=322 bgcolor=#fefefe
| 75322 ||  || — || December 7, 1999 || Socorro || LINEAR || — || align=right | 1.9 km || 
|-id=323 bgcolor=#fefefe
| 75323 ||  || — || December 7, 1999 || Socorro || LINEAR || — || align=right | 2.5 km || 
|-id=324 bgcolor=#fefefe
| 75324 ||  || — || December 7, 1999 || Socorro || LINEAR || — || align=right | 2.3 km || 
|-id=325 bgcolor=#fefefe
| 75325 ||  || — || December 7, 1999 || Socorro || LINEAR || V || align=right | 1.7 km || 
|-id=326 bgcolor=#fefefe
| 75326 ||  || — || December 7, 1999 || Socorro || LINEAR || NYS || align=right | 1.1 km || 
|-id=327 bgcolor=#fefefe
| 75327 ||  || — || December 7, 1999 || Socorro || LINEAR || MAS || align=right | 1.5 km || 
|-id=328 bgcolor=#fefefe
| 75328 ||  || — || December 7, 1999 || Socorro || LINEAR || V || align=right | 1.4 km || 
|-id=329 bgcolor=#fefefe
| 75329 ||  || — || December 7, 1999 || Socorro || LINEAR || NYS || align=right | 1.8 km || 
|-id=330 bgcolor=#fefefe
| 75330 ||  || — || December 7, 1999 || Socorro || LINEAR || — || align=right | 1.6 km || 
|-id=331 bgcolor=#E9E9E9
| 75331 ||  || — || December 7, 1999 || Socorro || LINEAR || — || align=right | 2.3 km || 
|-id=332 bgcolor=#E9E9E9
| 75332 ||  || — || December 7, 1999 || Socorro || LINEAR || EUN || align=right | 2.7 km || 
|-id=333 bgcolor=#fefefe
| 75333 ||  || — || December 7, 1999 || Socorro || LINEAR || NYS || align=right | 1.5 km || 
|-id=334 bgcolor=#fefefe
| 75334 ||  || — || December 7, 1999 || Socorro || LINEAR || — || align=right | 2.2 km || 
|-id=335 bgcolor=#E9E9E9
| 75335 ||  || — || December 7, 1999 || Socorro || LINEAR || — || align=right | 2.4 km || 
|-id=336 bgcolor=#E9E9E9
| 75336 ||  || — || December 7, 1999 || Socorro || LINEAR || — || align=right | 2.4 km || 
|-id=337 bgcolor=#fefefe
| 75337 ||  || — || December 7, 1999 || Socorro || LINEAR || — || align=right | 1.7 km || 
|-id=338 bgcolor=#E9E9E9
| 75338 ||  || — || December 7, 1999 || Socorro || LINEAR || — || align=right | 2.8 km || 
|-id=339 bgcolor=#E9E9E9
| 75339 ||  || — || December 7, 1999 || Socorro || LINEAR || — || align=right | 3.9 km || 
|-id=340 bgcolor=#E9E9E9
| 75340 ||  || — || December 7, 1999 || Socorro || LINEAR || — || align=right | 3.7 km || 
|-id=341 bgcolor=#fefefe
| 75341 ||  || — || December 7, 1999 || Socorro || LINEAR || NYS || align=right | 1.8 km || 
|-id=342 bgcolor=#E9E9E9
| 75342 ||  || — || December 7, 1999 || Socorro || LINEAR || — || align=right | 2.1 km || 
|-id=343 bgcolor=#E9E9E9
| 75343 ||  || — || December 7, 1999 || Socorro || LINEAR || — || align=right | 2.9 km || 
|-id=344 bgcolor=#fefefe
| 75344 ||  || — || December 7, 1999 || Socorro || LINEAR || — || align=right | 2.3 km || 
|-id=345 bgcolor=#fefefe
| 75345 ||  || — || December 7, 1999 || Socorro || LINEAR || NYS || align=right | 3.6 km || 
|-id=346 bgcolor=#fefefe
| 75346 ||  || — || December 7, 1999 || Socorro || LINEAR || MAS || align=right | 1.9 km || 
|-id=347 bgcolor=#fefefe
| 75347 ||  || — || December 7, 1999 || Socorro || LINEAR || — || align=right | 2.2 km || 
|-id=348 bgcolor=#E9E9E9
| 75348 ||  || — || December 7, 1999 || Socorro || LINEAR || — || align=right | 5.1 km || 
|-id=349 bgcolor=#E9E9E9
| 75349 ||  || — || December 7, 1999 || Socorro || LINEAR || — || align=right | 4.2 km || 
|-id=350 bgcolor=#E9E9E9
| 75350 ||  || — || December 7, 1999 || Socorro || LINEAR || — || align=right | 2.7 km || 
|-id=351 bgcolor=#fefefe
| 75351 ||  || — || December 7, 1999 || Socorro || LINEAR || V || align=right | 1.5 km || 
|-id=352 bgcolor=#E9E9E9
| 75352 ||  || — || December 7, 1999 || Socorro || LINEAR || MAR || align=right | 2.5 km || 
|-id=353 bgcolor=#fefefe
| 75353 ||  || — || December 7, 1999 || Socorro || LINEAR || EUTslow || align=right | 1.8 km || 
|-id=354 bgcolor=#fefefe
| 75354 ||  || — || December 7, 1999 || Socorro || LINEAR || V || align=right | 2.0 km || 
|-id=355 bgcolor=#fefefe
| 75355 ||  || — || December 7, 1999 || Socorro || LINEAR || MAS || align=right | 2.2 km || 
|-id=356 bgcolor=#E9E9E9
| 75356 ||  || — || December 7, 1999 || Socorro || LINEAR || — || align=right | 3.7 km || 
|-id=357 bgcolor=#fefefe
| 75357 ||  || — || December 7, 1999 || Socorro || LINEAR || NYS || align=right | 1.7 km || 
|-id=358 bgcolor=#fefefe
| 75358 ||  || — || December 7, 1999 || Socorro || LINEAR || NYS || align=right | 1.3 km || 
|-id=359 bgcolor=#fefefe
| 75359 ||  || — || December 7, 1999 || Socorro || LINEAR || — || align=right | 3.0 km || 
|-id=360 bgcolor=#E9E9E9
| 75360 ||  || — || December 7, 1999 || Socorro || LINEAR || — || align=right | 2.2 km || 
|-id=361 bgcolor=#fefefe
| 75361 ||  || — || December 7, 1999 || Socorro || LINEAR || — || align=right | 3.2 km || 
|-id=362 bgcolor=#fefefe
| 75362 ||  || — || December 7, 1999 || Socorro || LINEAR || — || align=right | 2.0 km || 
|-id=363 bgcolor=#E9E9E9
| 75363 ||  || — || December 7, 1999 || Socorro || LINEAR || — || align=right | 2.7 km || 
|-id=364 bgcolor=#fefefe
| 75364 ||  || — || December 7, 1999 || Socorro || LINEAR || SUL || align=right | 6.8 km || 
|-id=365 bgcolor=#fefefe
| 75365 ||  || — || December 7, 1999 || Socorro || LINEAR || — || align=right | 2.6 km || 
|-id=366 bgcolor=#E9E9E9
| 75366 ||  || — || December 7, 1999 || Socorro || LINEAR || EUN || align=right | 3.7 km || 
|-id=367 bgcolor=#fefefe
| 75367 ||  || — || December 7, 1999 || Socorro || LINEAR || — || align=right | 3.7 km || 
|-id=368 bgcolor=#E9E9E9
| 75368 ||  || — || December 7, 1999 || Socorro || LINEAR || — || align=right | 4.3 km || 
|-id=369 bgcolor=#fefefe
| 75369 ||  || — || December 7, 1999 || Socorro || LINEAR || — || align=right | 2.3 km || 
|-id=370 bgcolor=#E9E9E9
| 75370 ||  || — || December 7, 1999 || Socorro || LINEAR || MIT || align=right | 7.1 km || 
|-id=371 bgcolor=#fefefe
| 75371 ||  || — || December 7, 1999 || Socorro || LINEAR || EUT || align=right | 2.4 km || 
|-id=372 bgcolor=#fefefe
| 75372 ||  || — || December 7, 1999 || Socorro || LINEAR || — || align=right | 2.6 km || 
|-id=373 bgcolor=#E9E9E9
| 75373 ||  || — || December 7, 1999 || Socorro || LINEAR || — || align=right | 2.7 km || 
|-id=374 bgcolor=#fefefe
| 75374 ||  || — || December 7, 1999 || Socorro || LINEAR || — || align=right | 3.4 km || 
|-id=375 bgcolor=#E9E9E9
| 75375 ||  || — || December 7, 1999 || Socorro || LINEAR || — || align=right | 7.1 km || 
|-id=376 bgcolor=#E9E9E9
| 75376 ||  || — || December 7, 1999 || Socorro || LINEAR || — || align=right | 3.0 km || 
|-id=377 bgcolor=#E9E9E9
| 75377 ||  || — || December 7, 1999 || Socorro || LINEAR || — || align=right | 2.2 km || 
|-id=378 bgcolor=#fefefe
| 75378 ||  || — || December 7, 1999 || Socorro || LINEAR || — || align=right | 2.5 km || 
|-id=379 bgcolor=#E9E9E9
| 75379 ||  || — || December 7, 1999 || Socorro || LINEAR || — || align=right | 4.9 km || 
|-id=380 bgcolor=#E9E9E9
| 75380 ||  || — || December 7, 1999 || Socorro || LINEAR || MAR || align=right | 2.5 km || 
|-id=381 bgcolor=#E9E9E9
| 75381 ||  || — || December 7, 1999 || Socorro || LINEAR || DOR || align=right | 9.7 km || 
|-id=382 bgcolor=#E9E9E9
| 75382 ||  || — || December 7, 1999 || Socorro || LINEAR || — || align=right | 3.3 km || 
|-id=383 bgcolor=#E9E9E9
| 75383 ||  || — || December 7, 1999 || Socorro || LINEAR || — || align=right | 5.6 km || 
|-id=384 bgcolor=#E9E9E9
| 75384 ||  || — || December 7, 1999 || Socorro || LINEAR || EUN || align=right | 3.8 km || 
|-id=385 bgcolor=#E9E9E9
| 75385 ||  || — || December 7, 1999 || Socorro || LINEAR || HEN || align=right | 3.1 km || 
|-id=386 bgcolor=#E9E9E9
| 75386 ||  || — || December 7, 1999 || Socorro || LINEAR || EUN || align=right | 3.3 km || 
|-id=387 bgcolor=#E9E9E9
| 75387 ||  || — || December 7, 1999 || Socorro || LINEAR || — || align=right | 3.1 km || 
|-id=388 bgcolor=#E9E9E9
| 75388 ||  || — || December 7, 1999 || Socorro || LINEAR || — || align=right | 4.4 km || 
|-id=389 bgcolor=#E9E9E9
| 75389 ||  || — || December 7, 1999 || Socorro || LINEAR || — || align=right | 3.0 km || 
|-id=390 bgcolor=#E9E9E9
| 75390 ||  || — || December 7, 1999 || Oizumi || T. Kobayashi || MAR || align=right | 2.4 km || 
|-id=391 bgcolor=#fefefe
| 75391 ||  || — || December 7, 1999 || Socorro || LINEAR || ERI || align=right | 5.5 km || 
|-id=392 bgcolor=#fefefe
| 75392 ||  || — || December 7, 1999 || Socorro || LINEAR || NYS || align=right | 3.7 km || 
|-id=393 bgcolor=#fefefe
| 75393 ||  || — || December 7, 1999 || Socorro || LINEAR || NYS || align=right | 1.6 km || 
|-id=394 bgcolor=#fefefe
| 75394 ||  || — || December 7, 1999 || Socorro || LINEAR || — || align=right | 2.1 km || 
|-id=395 bgcolor=#fefefe
| 75395 ||  || — || December 7, 1999 || Socorro || LINEAR || — || align=right | 2.3 km || 
|-id=396 bgcolor=#fefefe
| 75396 ||  || — || December 7, 1999 || Socorro || LINEAR || V || align=right | 2.5 km || 
|-id=397 bgcolor=#fefefe
| 75397 ||  || — || December 7, 1999 || Socorro || LINEAR || NYS || align=right | 2.5 km || 
|-id=398 bgcolor=#fefefe
| 75398 ||  || — || December 7, 1999 || Socorro || LINEAR || — || align=right | 2.9 km || 
|-id=399 bgcolor=#E9E9E9
| 75399 ||  || — || December 7, 1999 || Socorro || LINEAR || — || align=right | 2.2 km || 
|-id=400 bgcolor=#E9E9E9
| 75400 ||  || — || December 7, 1999 || Socorro || LINEAR || — || align=right | 2.9 km || 
|}

75401–75500 

|-bgcolor=#E9E9E9
| 75401 ||  || — || December 7, 1999 || Socorro || LINEAR || — || align=right | 3.4 km || 
|-id=402 bgcolor=#E9E9E9
| 75402 ||  || — || December 7, 1999 || Socorro || LINEAR || — || align=right | 4.2 km || 
|-id=403 bgcolor=#fefefe
| 75403 ||  || — || December 7, 1999 || Socorro || LINEAR || V || align=right | 1.9 km || 
|-id=404 bgcolor=#fefefe
| 75404 ||  || — || December 7, 1999 || Socorro || LINEAR || V || align=right | 2.0 km || 
|-id=405 bgcolor=#d6d6d6
| 75405 ||  || — || December 7, 1999 || Socorro || LINEAR || — || align=right | 3.2 km || 
|-id=406 bgcolor=#fefefe
| 75406 ||  || — || December 7, 1999 || Socorro || LINEAR || MAS || align=right | 1.7 km || 
|-id=407 bgcolor=#fefefe
| 75407 ||  || — || December 7, 1999 || Socorro || LINEAR || NYS || align=right | 2.3 km || 
|-id=408 bgcolor=#fefefe
| 75408 ||  || — || December 7, 1999 || Socorro || LINEAR || — || align=right | 2.5 km || 
|-id=409 bgcolor=#FA8072
| 75409 ||  || — || December 9, 1999 || Fountain Hills || C. W. Juels || PHO || align=right | 2.8 km || 
|-id=410 bgcolor=#fefefe
| 75410 ||  || — || December 10, 1999 || Oizumi || T. Kobayashi || — || align=right | 2.1 km || 
|-id=411 bgcolor=#fefefe
| 75411 ||  || — || December 4, 1999 || Catalina || CSS || FLO || align=right | 2.4 km || 
|-id=412 bgcolor=#FA8072
| 75412 ||  || — || December 4, 1999 || Catalina || CSS || — || align=right | 2.5 km || 
|-id=413 bgcolor=#fefefe
| 75413 ||  || — || December 5, 1999 || Catalina || CSS || — || align=right | 2.3 km || 
|-id=414 bgcolor=#fefefe
| 75414 ||  || — || December 7, 1999 || Socorro || LINEAR || MAS || align=right | 1.5 km || 
|-id=415 bgcolor=#fefefe
| 75415 ||  || — || December 4, 1999 || Catalina || CSS || FLO || align=right | 1.9 km || 
|-id=416 bgcolor=#fefefe
| 75416 ||  || — || December 5, 1999 || Catalina || CSS || — || align=right | 2.9 km || 
|-id=417 bgcolor=#fefefe
| 75417 ||  || — || December 5, 1999 || Catalina || CSS || FLO || align=right | 1.6 km || 
|-id=418 bgcolor=#fefefe
| 75418 ||  || — || December 5, 1999 || Catalina || CSS || — || align=right | 2.7 km || 
|-id=419 bgcolor=#fefefe
| 75419 ||  || — || December 5, 1999 || Catalina || CSS || — || align=right | 2.6 km || 
|-id=420 bgcolor=#fefefe
| 75420 ||  || — || December 5, 1999 || Catalina || CSS || NYS || align=right | 1.7 km || 
|-id=421 bgcolor=#E9E9E9
| 75421 ||  || — || December 5, 1999 || Catalina || CSS || — || align=right | 2.7 km || 
|-id=422 bgcolor=#fefefe
| 75422 ||  || — || December 5, 1999 || Catalina || CSS || — || align=right | 1.6 km || 
|-id=423 bgcolor=#fefefe
| 75423 ||  || — || December 5, 1999 || Catalina || CSS || V || align=right | 2.2 km || 
|-id=424 bgcolor=#fefefe
| 75424 ||  || — || December 5, 1999 || Catalina || CSS || — || align=right | 2.5 km || 
|-id=425 bgcolor=#E9E9E9
| 75425 ||  || — || December 5, 1999 || Catalina || CSS || — || align=right | 2.6 km || 
|-id=426 bgcolor=#fefefe
| 75426 ||  || — || December 7, 1999 || Catalina || CSS || V || align=right | 2.7 km || 
|-id=427 bgcolor=#fefefe
| 75427 ||  || — || December 7, 1999 || Catalina || CSS || V || align=right | 1.6 km || 
|-id=428 bgcolor=#fefefe
| 75428 ||  || — || December 7, 1999 || Catalina || CSS || — || align=right | 2.4 km || 
|-id=429 bgcolor=#fefefe
| 75429 ||  || — || December 7, 1999 || Catalina || CSS || — || align=right | 2.7 km || 
|-id=430 bgcolor=#E9E9E9
| 75430 ||  || — || December 7, 1999 || Catalina || CSS || — || align=right | 9.2 km || 
|-id=431 bgcolor=#fefefe
| 75431 ||  || — || December 7, 1999 || Catalina || CSS || — || align=right | 2.1 km || 
|-id=432 bgcolor=#fefefe
| 75432 ||  || — || December 7, 1999 || Catalina || CSS || V || align=right | 1.7 km || 
|-id=433 bgcolor=#E9E9E9
| 75433 ||  || — || December 7, 1999 || Catalina || CSS || — || align=right | 9.4 km || 
|-id=434 bgcolor=#fefefe
| 75434 ||  || — || December 7, 1999 || Catalina || CSS || — || align=right | 2.4 km || 
|-id=435 bgcolor=#fefefe
| 75435 ||  || — || December 7, 1999 || Catalina || CSS || — || align=right | 1.9 km || 
|-id=436 bgcolor=#E9E9E9
| 75436 ||  || — || December 7, 1999 || Catalina || CSS || — || align=right | 3.5 km || 
|-id=437 bgcolor=#E9E9E9
| 75437 ||  || — || December 6, 1999 || Ondřejov || P. Kušnirák || MAR || align=right | 3.2 km || 
|-id=438 bgcolor=#fefefe
| 75438 ||  || — || December 7, 1999 || Socorro || LINEAR || — || align=right | 2.4 km || 
|-id=439 bgcolor=#fefefe
| 75439 ||  || — || December 7, 1999 || Socorro || LINEAR || MAS || align=right | 1.7 km || 
|-id=440 bgcolor=#E9E9E9
| 75440 ||  || — || December 7, 1999 || Socorro || LINEAR || — || align=right | 2.3 km || 
|-id=441 bgcolor=#fefefe
| 75441 ||  || — || December 12, 1999 || Socorro || LINEAR || — || align=right | 2.8 km || 
|-id=442 bgcolor=#fefefe
| 75442 ||  || — || December 12, 1999 || Socorro || LINEAR || — || align=right | 2.2 km || 
|-id=443 bgcolor=#fefefe
| 75443 ||  || — || December 12, 1999 || Socorro || LINEAR || — || align=right | 2.1 km || 
|-id=444 bgcolor=#fefefe
| 75444 ||  || — || December 12, 1999 || Socorro || LINEAR || V || align=right | 1.9 km || 
|-id=445 bgcolor=#fefefe
| 75445 ||  || — || December 12, 1999 || Socorro || LINEAR || — || align=right | 2.5 km || 
|-id=446 bgcolor=#E9E9E9
| 75446 ||  || — || December 12, 1999 || Socorro || LINEAR || — || align=right | 3.7 km || 
|-id=447 bgcolor=#E9E9E9
| 75447 ||  || — || December 6, 1999 || Socorro || LINEAR || — || align=right | 6.5 km || 
|-id=448 bgcolor=#E9E9E9
| 75448 ||  || — || December 8, 1999 || Socorro || LINEAR || GAL || align=right | 4.3 km || 
|-id=449 bgcolor=#d6d6d6
| 75449 ||  || — || December 15, 1999 || Prescott || P. G. Comba || FIR || align=right | 5.8 km || 
|-id=450 bgcolor=#fefefe
| 75450 ||  || — || December 10, 1999 || Uccle || T. Pauwels || — || align=right | 2.1 km || 
|-id=451 bgcolor=#E9E9E9
| 75451 ||  || — || December 5, 1999 || Kitt Peak || Spacewatch || — || align=right | 3.7 km || 
|-id=452 bgcolor=#fefefe
| 75452 ||  || — || December 12, 1999 || Socorro || LINEAR || PHO || align=right | 3.6 km || 
|-id=453 bgcolor=#E9E9E9
| 75453 ||  || — || December 13, 1999 || Socorro || LINEAR || — || align=right | 7.3 km || 
|-id=454 bgcolor=#fefefe
| 75454 ||  || — || December 15, 1999 || Fountain Hills || C. W. Juels || — || align=right | 3.4 km || 
|-id=455 bgcolor=#E9E9E9
| 75455 ||  || — || December 7, 1999 || Kitt Peak || Spacewatch || — || align=right | 2.2 km || 
|-id=456 bgcolor=#E9E9E9
| 75456 ||  || — || December 7, 1999 || Kitt Peak || Spacewatch || — || align=right | 1.9 km || 
|-id=457 bgcolor=#fefefe
| 75457 ||  || — || December 7, 1999 || Kitt Peak || Spacewatch || NYS || align=right | 1.1 km || 
|-id=458 bgcolor=#fefefe
| 75458 ||  || — || December 7, 1999 || Kitt Peak || Spacewatch || NYS || align=right | 1.6 km || 
|-id=459 bgcolor=#E9E9E9
| 75459 ||  || — || December 7, 1999 || Kitt Peak || Spacewatch || — || align=right | 3.2 km || 
|-id=460 bgcolor=#fefefe
| 75460 ||  || — || December 13, 1999 || Anderson Mesa || LONEOS || — || align=right | 2.2 km || 
|-id=461 bgcolor=#E9E9E9
| 75461 ||  || — || December 8, 1999 || Socorro || LINEAR || — || align=right | 2.3 km || 
|-id=462 bgcolor=#E9E9E9
| 75462 ||  || — || December 8, 1999 || Socorro || LINEAR || EUN || align=right | 3.1 km || 
|-id=463 bgcolor=#fefefe
| 75463 ||  || — || December 8, 1999 || Socorro || LINEAR || NYS || align=right | 1.9 km || 
|-id=464 bgcolor=#fefefe
| 75464 ||  || — || December 8, 1999 || Socorro || LINEAR || NYS || align=right | 2.5 km || 
|-id=465 bgcolor=#fefefe
| 75465 ||  || — || December 8, 1999 || Socorro || LINEAR || NYS || align=right | 1.6 km || 
|-id=466 bgcolor=#E9E9E9
| 75466 ||  || — || December 8, 1999 || Socorro || LINEAR || — || align=right | 3.0 km || 
|-id=467 bgcolor=#E9E9E9
| 75467 ||  || — || December 9, 1999 || Catalina || CSS || — || align=right | 6.7 km || 
|-id=468 bgcolor=#fefefe
| 75468 ||  || — || December 12, 1999 || Socorro || LINEAR || V || align=right | 1.5 km || 
|-id=469 bgcolor=#E9E9E9
| 75469 ||  || — || December 8, 1999 || Kitt Peak || Spacewatch || — || align=right | 2.5 km || 
|-id=470 bgcolor=#E9E9E9
| 75470 ||  || — || December 8, 1999 || Socorro || LINEAR || — || align=right | 3.9 km || 
|-id=471 bgcolor=#fefefe
| 75471 ||  || — || December 8, 1999 || Socorro || LINEAR || — || align=right | 3.5 km || 
|-id=472 bgcolor=#E9E9E9
| 75472 ||  || — || December 8, 1999 || Socorro || LINEAR || — || align=right | 5.8 km || 
|-id=473 bgcolor=#fefefe
| 75473 ||  || — || December 8, 1999 || Socorro || LINEAR || NYS || align=right | 7.5 km || 
|-id=474 bgcolor=#fefefe
| 75474 ||  || — || December 8, 1999 || Socorro || LINEAR || — || align=right | 2.6 km || 
|-id=475 bgcolor=#fefefe
| 75475 ||  || — || December 10, 1999 || Socorro || LINEAR || — || align=right | 3.1 km || 
|-id=476 bgcolor=#fefefe
| 75476 ||  || — || December 10, 1999 || Socorro || LINEAR || — || align=right | 2.2 km || 
|-id=477 bgcolor=#fefefe
| 75477 ||  || — || December 10, 1999 || Socorro || LINEAR || — || align=right | 2.0 km || 
|-id=478 bgcolor=#fefefe
| 75478 ||  || — || December 10, 1999 || Socorro || LINEAR || FLO || align=right | 2.3 km || 
|-id=479 bgcolor=#fefefe
| 75479 ||  || — || December 10, 1999 || Socorro || LINEAR || — || align=right | 2.5 km || 
|-id=480 bgcolor=#fefefe
| 75480 ||  || — || December 10, 1999 || Socorro || LINEAR || — || align=right | 6.2 km || 
|-id=481 bgcolor=#fefefe
| 75481 ||  || — || December 10, 1999 || Socorro || LINEAR || — || align=right | 2.9 km || 
|-id=482 bgcolor=#fefefe
| 75482 ||  || — || December 10, 1999 || Socorro || LINEAR || slow || align=right | 3.5 km || 
|-id=483 bgcolor=#fefefe
| 75483 ||  || — || December 10, 1999 || Socorro || LINEAR || — || align=right | 5.9 km || 
|-id=484 bgcolor=#E9E9E9
| 75484 ||  || — || December 10, 1999 || Socorro || LINEAR || — || align=right | 3.3 km || 
|-id=485 bgcolor=#fefefe
| 75485 ||  || — || December 10, 1999 || Socorro || LINEAR || — || align=right | 2.7 km || 
|-id=486 bgcolor=#fefefe
| 75486 ||  || — || December 10, 1999 || Socorro || LINEAR || — || align=right | 3.4 km || 
|-id=487 bgcolor=#E9E9E9
| 75487 ||  || — || December 10, 1999 || Socorro || LINEAR || — || align=right | 4.9 km || 
|-id=488 bgcolor=#E9E9E9
| 75488 ||  || — || December 10, 1999 || Socorro || LINEAR || — || align=right | 2.6 km || 
|-id=489 bgcolor=#fefefe
| 75489 ||  || — || December 10, 1999 || Socorro || LINEAR || — || align=right | 1.5 km || 
|-id=490 bgcolor=#E9E9E9
| 75490 ||  || — || December 10, 1999 || Socorro || LINEAR || EUN || align=right | 6.4 km || 
|-id=491 bgcolor=#E9E9E9
| 75491 ||  || — || December 10, 1999 || Socorro || LINEAR || MAR || align=right | 2.6 km || 
|-id=492 bgcolor=#E9E9E9
| 75492 ||  || — || December 10, 1999 || Socorro || LINEAR || — || align=right | 3.2 km || 
|-id=493 bgcolor=#fefefe
| 75493 ||  || — || December 10, 1999 || Socorro || LINEAR || — || align=right | 3.0 km || 
|-id=494 bgcolor=#fefefe
| 75494 ||  || — || December 12, 1999 || Socorro || LINEAR || — || align=right | 2.1 km || 
|-id=495 bgcolor=#fefefe
| 75495 ||  || — || December 12, 1999 || Socorro || LINEAR || — || align=right | 2.0 km || 
|-id=496 bgcolor=#E9E9E9
| 75496 ||  || — || December 12, 1999 || Socorro || LINEAR || MAR || align=right | 3.0 km || 
|-id=497 bgcolor=#fefefe
| 75497 ||  || — || December 12, 1999 || Socorro || LINEAR || — || align=right | 2.8 km || 
|-id=498 bgcolor=#E9E9E9
| 75498 ||  || — || December 12, 1999 || Socorro || LINEAR || — || align=right | 3.3 km || 
|-id=499 bgcolor=#fefefe
| 75499 ||  || — || December 12, 1999 || Socorro || LINEAR || — || align=right | 2.3 km || 
|-id=500 bgcolor=#fefefe
| 75500 ||  || — || December 12, 1999 || Socorro || LINEAR || — || align=right | 2.0 km || 
|}

75501–75600 

|-bgcolor=#fefefe
| 75501 ||  || — || December 12, 1999 || Socorro || LINEAR || — || align=right | 2.4 km || 
|-id=502 bgcolor=#E9E9E9
| 75502 ||  || — || December 12, 1999 || Socorro || LINEAR || — || align=right | 4.4 km || 
|-id=503 bgcolor=#fefefe
| 75503 ||  || — || December 12, 1999 || Socorro || LINEAR || — || align=right | 2.6 km || 
|-id=504 bgcolor=#fefefe
| 75504 ||  || — || December 12, 1999 || Socorro || LINEAR || V || align=right | 1.9 km || 
|-id=505 bgcolor=#fefefe
| 75505 ||  || — || December 12, 1999 || Socorro || LINEAR || — || align=right | 2.7 km || 
|-id=506 bgcolor=#fefefe
| 75506 ||  || — || December 12, 1999 || Socorro || LINEAR || V || align=right | 1.4 km || 
|-id=507 bgcolor=#fefefe
| 75507 ||  || — || December 12, 1999 || Socorro || LINEAR || V || align=right | 2.0 km || 
|-id=508 bgcolor=#E9E9E9
| 75508 ||  || — || December 12, 1999 || Socorro || LINEAR || AER || align=right | 3.1 km || 
|-id=509 bgcolor=#E9E9E9
| 75509 ||  || — || December 12, 1999 || Socorro || LINEAR || PAE || align=right | 5.8 km || 
|-id=510 bgcolor=#fefefe
| 75510 ||  || — || December 12, 1999 || Socorro || LINEAR || V || align=right | 1.9 km || 
|-id=511 bgcolor=#E9E9E9
| 75511 ||  || — || December 12, 1999 || Socorro || LINEAR || — || align=right | 4.1 km || 
|-id=512 bgcolor=#E9E9E9
| 75512 ||  || — || December 12, 1999 || Socorro || LINEAR || — || align=right | 4.4 km || 
|-id=513 bgcolor=#E9E9E9
| 75513 ||  || — || December 12, 1999 || Socorro || LINEAR || GEF || align=right | 2.3 km || 
|-id=514 bgcolor=#E9E9E9
| 75514 ||  || — || December 12, 1999 || Socorro || LINEAR || — || align=right | 4.9 km || 
|-id=515 bgcolor=#E9E9E9
| 75515 ||  || — || December 12, 1999 || Socorro || LINEAR || — || align=right | 5.2 km || 
|-id=516 bgcolor=#E9E9E9
| 75516 ||  || — || December 12, 1999 || Socorro || LINEAR || EUN || align=right | 2.2 km || 
|-id=517 bgcolor=#E9E9E9
| 75517 ||  || — || December 12, 1999 || Socorro || LINEAR || MAR || align=right | 2.8 km || 
|-id=518 bgcolor=#E9E9E9
| 75518 ||  || — || December 12, 1999 || Socorro || LINEAR || RAF || align=right | 2.7 km || 
|-id=519 bgcolor=#E9E9E9
| 75519 ||  || — || December 12, 1999 || Socorro || LINEAR || — || align=right | 3.1 km || 
|-id=520 bgcolor=#E9E9E9
| 75520 ||  || — || December 12, 1999 || Socorro || LINEAR || ADE || align=right | 9.6 km || 
|-id=521 bgcolor=#fefefe
| 75521 ||  || — || December 12, 1999 || Socorro || LINEAR || V || align=right | 1.9 km || 
|-id=522 bgcolor=#fefefe
| 75522 ||  || — || December 12, 1999 || Socorro || LINEAR || — || align=right | 3.1 km || 
|-id=523 bgcolor=#E9E9E9
| 75523 ||  || — || December 12, 1999 || Socorro || LINEAR || ADE || align=right | 9.1 km || 
|-id=524 bgcolor=#E9E9E9
| 75524 ||  || — || December 12, 1999 || Socorro || LINEAR || — || align=right | 7.8 km || 
|-id=525 bgcolor=#E9E9E9
| 75525 ||  || — || December 13, 1999 || Socorro || LINEAR || — || align=right | 3.9 km || 
|-id=526 bgcolor=#E9E9E9
| 75526 ||  || — || December 13, 1999 || Socorro || LINEAR || EUN || align=right | 4.8 km || 
|-id=527 bgcolor=#fefefe
| 75527 ||  || — || December 14, 1999 || Socorro || LINEAR || — || align=right | 2.8 km || 
|-id=528 bgcolor=#E9E9E9
| 75528 ||  || — || December 14, 1999 || Socorro || LINEAR || EUN || align=right | 3.0 km || 
|-id=529 bgcolor=#fefefe
| 75529 ||  || — || December 14, 1999 || Socorro || LINEAR || — || align=right | 1.8 km || 
|-id=530 bgcolor=#fefefe
| 75530 ||  || — || December 13, 1999 || Kitt Peak || Spacewatch || — || align=right | 2.1 km || 
|-id=531 bgcolor=#E9E9E9
| 75531 ||  || — || December 13, 1999 || Kitt Peak || Spacewatch || — || align=right | 5.7 km || 
|-id=532 bgcolor=#fefefe
| 75532 ||  || — || December 13, 1999 || Socorro || LINEAR || V || align=right | 1.3 km || 
|-id=533 bgcolor=#fefefe
| 75533 ||  || — || December 14, 1999 || Kitt Peak || Spacewatch || NYS || align=right | 2.1 km || 
|-id=534 bgcolor=#E9E9E9
| 75534 ||  || — || December 15, 1999 || Kitt Peak || Spacewatch || — || align=right | 2.1 km || 
|-id=535 bgcolor=#fefefe
| 75535 ||  || — || December 14, 1999 || Kitt Peak || Spacewatch || — || align=right | 2.5 km || 
|-id=536 bgcolor=#fefefe
| 75536 ||  || — || December 7, 1999 || Anderson Mesa || LONEOS || — || align=right | 2.9 km || 
|-id=537 bgcolor=#fefefe
| 75537 ||  || — || December 7, 1999 || Anderson Mesa || LONEOS || — || align=right | 2.2 km || 
|-id=538 bgcolor=#E9E9E9
| 75538 ||  || — || December 7, 1999 || Catalina || CSS || — || align=right | 2.6 km || 
|-id=539 bgcolor=#fefefe
| 75539 ||  || — || December 12, 1999 || Socorro || LINEAR || PHO || align=right | 2.8 km || 
|-id=540 bgcolor=#fefefe
| 75540 ||  || — || December 3, 1999 || Anderson Mesa || LONEOS || FLO || align=right | 1.6 km || 
|-id=541 bgcolor=#fefefe
| 75541 ||  || — || December 3, 1999 || Anderson Mesa || LONEOS || — || align=right | 1.6 km || 
|-id=542 bgcolor=#fefefe
| 75542 ||  || — || December 5, 1999 || Catalina || CSS || MAS || align=right | 2.0 km || 
|-id=543 bgcolor=#fefefe
| 75543 ||  || — || December 13, 1999 || Catalina || CSS || V || align=right | 1.7 km || 
|-id=544 bgcolor=#fefefe
| 75544 ||  || — || December 6, 1999 || Socorro || LINEAR || — || align=right | 2.0 km || 
|-id=545 bgcolor=#E9E9E9
| 75545 ||  || — || December 9, 1999 || Kitt Peak || Spacewatch || — || align=right | 2.1 km || 
|-id=546 bgcolor=#fefefe
| 75546 ||  || — || December 6, 1999 || Socorro || LINEAR || V || align=right | 1.4 km || 
|-id=547 bgcolor=#fefefe
| 75547 ||  || — || December 7, 1999 || Socorro || LINEAR || — || align=right | 1.7 km || 
|-id=548 bgcolor=#E9E9E9
| 75548 ||  || — || December 8, 1999 || Socorro || LINEAR || — || align=right | 2.9 km || 
|-id=549 bgcolor=#E9E9E9
| 75549 ||  || — || December 8, 1999 || Socorro || LINEAR || — || align=right | 4.8 km || 
|-id=550 bgcolor=#E9E9E9
| 75550 ||  || — || December 16, 1999 || Socorro || LINEAR || — || align=right | 4.1 km || 
|-id=551 bgcolor=#d6d6d6
| 75551 ||  || — || December 27, 1999 || Farpoint || G. Hug, G. Bell || — || align=right | 5.3 km || 
|-id=552 bgcolor=#fefefe
| 75552 ||  || — || December 28, 1999 || Socorro || LINEAR || PHO || align=right | 2.8 km || 
|-id=553 bgcolor=#E9E9E9
| 75553 ||  || — || December 30, 1999 || Socorro || LINEAR || EUN || align=right | 3.3 km || 
|-id=554 bgcolor=#E9E9E9
| 75554 ||  || — || December 27, 1999 || Kitt Peak || Spacewatch || — || align=right | 1.7 km || 
|-id=555 bgcolor=#fefefe
| 75555 Wonaszek ||  ||  || December 31, 1999 || Piszkéstető || K. Sárneczky, L. Kiss || — || align=right | 1.7 km || 
|-id=556 bgcolor=#E9E9E9
| 75556 ||  || — || December 31, 1999 || Kitt Peak || Spacewatch || — || align=right | 2.3 km || 
|-id=557 bgcolor=#E9E9E9
| 75557 ||  || — || December 31, 1999 || Kitt Peak || Spacewatch || — || align=right | 1.5 km || 
|-id=558 bgcolor=#fefefe
| 75558 ||  || — || December 30, 1999 || Anderson Mesa || LONEOS || — || align=right | 3.4 km || 
|-id=559 bgcolor=#E9E9E9
| 75559 ||  || — || December 18, 1999 || Socorro || LINEAR || — || align=right | 8.7 km || 
|-id=560 bgcolor=#E9E9E9
| 75560 ||  || — || December 31, 1999 || Anderson Mesa || LONEOS || — || align=right | 3.0 km || 
|-id=561 bgcolor=#fefefe
| 75561 ||  || — || December 31, 1999 || Anderson Mesa || LONEOS || V || align=right | 2.1 km || 
|-id=562 bgcolor=#E9E9E9
| 75562 Wilkening ||  ||  || December 31, 1999 || Catalina || CSS || EUN || align=right | 2.7 km || 
|-id=563 bgcolor=#E9E9E9
| 75563 ||  || — || December 30, 1999 || Anderson Mesa || LONEOS || — || align=right | 2.7 km || 
|-id=564 bgcolor=#fefefe
| 75564 Audubon || 2000 AJ ||  || January 2, 2000 || Fountain Hills || C. W. Juels || — || align=right | 2.8 km || 
|-id=565 bgcolor=#E9E9E9
| 75565 || 2000 AY || — || January 2, 2000 || Kitt Peak || Spacewatch || — || align=right | 3.1 km || 
|-id=566 bgcolor=#E9E9E9
| 75566 || 2000 AZ || — || January 2, 2000 || Kitt Peak || Spacewatch || — || align=right | 3.8 km || 
|-id=567 bgcolor=#FA8072
| 75567 ||  || — || January 2, 2000 || Socorro || LINEAR || — || align=right | 2.5 km || 
|-id=568 bgcolor=#fefefe
| 75568 ||  || — || January 2, 2000 || Višnjan Observatory || K. Korlević || V || align=right | 2.3 km || 
|-id=569 bgcolor=#fefefe
| 75569 IRSOL ||  ||  || January 2, 2000 || Gnosca || S. Sposetti || — || align=right | 2.5 km || 
|-id=570 bgcolor=#d6d6d6
| 75570 Jenőwigner ||  ||  || January 1, 2000 || Piszkéstető || K. Sárneczky, L. Kiss || — || align=right | 6.2 km || 
|-id=571 bgcolor=#fefefe
| 75571 ||  || — || January 3, 2000 || Powell || Powell Obs. || V || align=right | 1.6 km || 
|-id=572 bgcolor=#E9E9E9
| 75572 ||  || — || January 4, 2000 || Prescott || P. G. Comba || — || align=right | 5.6 km || 
|-id=573 bgcolor=#fefefe
| 75573 ||  || — || January 2, 2000 || Socorro || LINEAR || — || align=right | 2.9 km || 
|-id=574 bgcolor=#E9E9E9
| 75574 ||  || — || January 2, 2000 || Socorro || LINEAR || EUN || align=right | 3.8 km || 
|-id=575 bgcolor=#fefefe
| 75575 ||  || — || January 2, 2000 || Socorro || LINEAR || — || align=right | 1.8 km || 
|-id=576 bgcolor=#fefefe
| 75576 ||  || — || January 3, 2000 || Socorro || LINEAR || — || align=right | 2.9 km || 
|-id=577 bgcolor=#fefefe
| 75577 ||  || — || January 3, 2000 || Socorro || LINEAR || — || align=right | 2.1 km || 
|-id=578 bgcolor=#fefefe
| 75578 ||  || — || January 3, 2000 || Socorro || LINEAR || FLO || align=right | 1.7 km || 
|-id=579 bgcolor=#fefefe
| 75579 ||  || — || January 3, 2000 || Socorro || LINEAR || MAS || align=right | 1.6 km || 
|-id=580 bgcolor=#fefefe
| 75580 ||  || — || January 3, 2000 || Socorro || LINEAR || NYS || align=right | 1.5 km || 
|-id=581 bgcolor=#fefefe
| 75581 ||  || — || January 3, 2000 || Socorro || LINEAR || NYS || align=right | 2.2 km || 
|-id=582 bgcolor=#fefefe
| 75582 ||  || — || January 3, 2000 || Socorro || LINEAR || V || align=right | 1.7 km || 
|-id=583 bgcolor=#fefefe
| 75583 ||  || — || January 3, 2000 || Socorro || LINEAR || NYS || align=right | 1.5 km || 
|-id=584 bgcolor=#fefefe
| 75584 ||  || — || January 3, 2000 || Socorro || LINEAR || — || align=right | 3.0 km || 
|-id=585 bgcolor=#fefefe
| 75585 ||  || — || January 3, 2000 || Socorro || LINEAR || V || align=right | 2.2 km || 
|-id=586 bgcolor=#fefefe
| 75586 ||  || — || January 3, 2000 || Socorro || LINEAR || FLO || align=right | 2.4 km || 
|-id=587 bgcolor=#fefefe
| 75587 ||  || — || January 3, 2000 || Socorro || LINEAR || V || align=right | 2.0 km || 
|-id=588 bgcolor=#fefefe
| 75588 ||  || — || January 3, 2000 || Socorro || LINEAR || — || align=right | 3.4 km || 
|-id=589 bgcolor=#E9E9E9
| 75589 ||  || — || January 3, 2000 || Socorro || LINEAR || — || align=right | 2.5 km || 
|-id=590 bgcolor=#fefefe
| 75590 ||  || — || January 3, 2000 || Socorro || LINEAR || V || align=right | 1.8 km || 
|-id=591 bgcolor=#fefefe
| 75591 Stonemose ||  ||  || January 3, 2000 || Socorro || LINEAR || V || align=right | 2.2 km || 
|-id=592 bgcolor=#E9E9E9
| 75592 ||  || — || January 3, 2000 || Socorro || LINEAR || VIB || align=right | 5.3 km || 
|-id=593 bgcolor=#fefefe
| 75593 ||  || — || January 3, 2000 || Socorro || LINEAR || — || align=right | 2.0 km || 
|-id=594 bgcolor=#E9E9E9
| 75594 ||  || — || January 3, 2000 || Socorro || LINEAR || — || align=right | 2.4 km || 
|-id=595 bgcolor=#fefefe
| 75595 ||  || — || January 3, 2000 || Socorro || LINEAR || NYS || align=right | 2.0 km || 
|-id=596 bgcolor=#fefefe
| 75596 ||  || — || January 3, 2000 || Socorro || LINEAR || — || align=right | 2.0 km || 
|-id=597 bgcolor=#E9E9E9
| 75597 ||  || — || January 3, 2000 || Socorro || LINEAR || RAF || align=right | 3.5 km || 
|-id=598 bgcolor=#E9E9E9
| 75598 ||  || — || January 3, 2000 || Socorro || LINEAR || — || align=right | 3.7 km || 
|-id=599 bgcolor=#E9E9E9
| 75599 ||  || — || January 3, 2000 || Socorro || LINEAR || — || align=right | 4.0 km || 
|-id=600 bgcolor=#E9E9E9
| 75600 ||  || — || January 3, 2000 || Socorro || LINEAR || — || align=right | 3.5 km || 
|}

75601–75700 

|-bgcolor=#E9E9E9
| 75601 ||  || — || January 3, 2000 || Socorro || LINEAR || — || align=right | 3.1 km || 
|-id=602 bgcolor=#fefefe
| 75602 ||  || — || January 3, 2000 || Socorro || LINEAR || MAS || align=right | 2.0 km || 
|-id=603 bgcolor=#fefefe
| 75603 ||  || — || January 3, 2000 || Socorro || LINEAR || V || align=right | 2.0 km || 
|-id=604 bgcolor=#E9E9E9
| 75604 ||  || — || January 3, 2000 || Socorro || LINEAR || MAR || align=right | 2.6 km || 
|-id=605 bgcolor=#fefefe
| 75605 ||  || — || January 3, 2000 || Socorro || LINEAR || V || align=right | 1.8 km || 
|-id=606 bgcolor=#E9E9E9
| 75606 ||  || — || January 3, 2000 || Socorro || LINEAR || EUN || align=right | 3.5 km || 
|-id=607 bgcolor=#E9E9E9
| 75607 ||  || — || January 3, 2000 || Socorro || LINEAR || — || align=right | 2.3 km || 
|-id=608 bgcolor=#E9E9E9
| 75608 ||  || — || January 3, 2000 || Socorro || LINEAR || EUN || align=right | 4.5 km || 
|-id=609 bgcolor=#E9E9E9
| 75609 ||  || — || January 3, 2000 || Socorro || LINEAR || — || align=right | 4.0 km || 
|-id=610 bgcolor=#E9E9E9
| 75610 ||  || — || January 3, 2000 || Socorro || LINEAR || — || align=right | 5.7 km || 
|-id=611 bgcolor=#E9E9E9
| 75611 ||  || — || January 3, 2000 || Socorro || LINEAR || — || align=right | 2.7 km || 
|-id=612 bgcolor=#E9E9E9
| 75612 ||  || — || January 3, 2000 || Socorro || LINEAR || EUN || align=right | 3.1 km || 
|-id=613 bgcolor=#E9E9E9
| 75613 ||  || — || January 3, 2000 || Socorro || LINEAR || — || align=right | 2.4 km || 
|-id=614 bgcolor=#E9E9E9
| 75614 ||  || — || January 3, 2000 || Socorro || LINEAR || MRX || align=right | 3.0 km || 
|-id=615 bgcolor=#E9E9E9
| 75615 ||  || — || January 3, 2000 || Socorro || LINEAR || — || align=right | 2.5 km || 
|-id=616 bgcolor=#E9E9E9
| 75616 ||  || — || January 3, 2000 || Socorro || LINEAR || — || align=right | 2.4 km || 
|-id=617 bgcolor=#fefefe
| 75617 ||  || — || January 3, 2000 || Socorro || LINEAR || V || align=right | 3.4 km || 
|-id=618 bgcolor=#fefefe
| 75618 ||  || — || January 3, 2000 || Socorro || LINEAR || PHO || align=right | 2.9 km || 
|-id=619 bgcolor=#fefefe
| 75619 ||  || — || January 4, 2000 || Socorro || LINEAR || FLO || align=right | 2.1 km || 
|-id=620 bgcolor=#fefefe
| 75620 ||  || — || January 4, 2000 || Socorro || LINEAR || — || align=right | 2.2 km || 
|-id=621 bgcolor=#fefefe
| 75621 ||  || — || January 5, 2000 || Socorro || LINEAR || — || align=right | 3.1 km || 
|-id=622 bgcolor=#fefefe
| 75622 ||  || — || January 3, 2000 || Socorro || LINEAR || — || align=right | 2.0 km || 
|-id=623 bgcolor=#E9E9E9
| 75623 ||  || — || January 4, 2000 || Socorro || LINEAR || — || align=right | 2.3 km || 
|-id=624 bgcolor=#fefefe
| 75624 ||  || — || January 4, 2000 || Socorro || LINEAR || NYS || align=right | 1.8 km || 
|-id=625 bgcolor=#E9E9E9
| 75625 ||  || — || January 4, 2000 || Socorro || LINEAR || — || align=right | 2.9 km || 
|-id=626 bgcolor=#fefefe
| 75626 ||  || — || January 4, 2000 || Socorro || LINEAR || — || align=right | 2.4 km || 
|-id=627 bgcolor=#fefefe
| 75627 ||  || — || January 5, 2000 || Socorro || LINEAR || — || align=right | 1.9 km || 
|-id=628 bgcolor=#fefefe
| 75628 ||  || — || January 5, 2000 || Socorro || LINEAR || — || align=right | 2.3 km || 
|-id=629 bgcolor=#E9E9E9
| 75629 ||  || — || January 6, 2000 || Višnjan Observatory || K. Korlević || GER || align=right | 3.4 km || 
|-id=630 bgcolor=#fefefe
| 75630 ||  || — || January 4, 2000 || Socorro || LINEAR || V || align=right | 2.5 km || 
|-id=631 bgcolor=#fefefe
| 75631 ||  || — || January 4, 2000 || Socorro || LINEAR || FLO || align=right | 2.2 km || 
|-id=632 bgcolor=#fefefe
| 75632 ||  || — || January 4, 2000 || Socorro || LINEAR || V || align=right | 2.3 km || 
|-id=633 bgcolor=#E9E9E9
| 75633 ||  || — || January 4, 2000 || Socorro || LINEAR || DOR || align=right | 4.9 km || 
|-id=634 bgcolor=#fefefe
| 75634 ||  || — || January 4, 2000 || Socorro || LINEAR || ERI || align=right | 4.7 km || 
|-id=635 bgcolor=#fefefe
| 75635 ||  || — || January 4, 2000 || Socorro || LINEAR || — || align=right | 4.0 km || 
|-id=636 bgcolor=#fefefe
| 75636 ||  || — || January 4, 2000 || Socorro || LINEAR || V || align=right | 2.0 km || 
|-id=637 bgcolor=#fefefe
| 75637 ||  || — || January 4, 2000 || Socorro || LINEAR || V || align=right | 2.1 km || 
|-id=638 bgcolor=#E9E9E9
| 75638 ||  || — || January 4, 2000 || Socorro || LINEAR || — || align=right | 2.7 km || 
|-id=639 bgcolor=#fefefe
| 75639 ||  || — || January 4, 2000 || Socorro || LINEAR || V || align=right | 1.3 km || 
|-id=640 bgcolor=#E9E9E9
| 75640 ||  || — || January 4, 2000 || Socorro || LINEAR || EUN || align=right | 3.9 km || 
|-id=641 bgcolor=#E9E9E9
| 75641 ||  || — || January 4, 2000 || Socorro || LINEAR || — || align=right | 3.4 km || 
|-id=642 bgcolor=#fefefe
| 75642 ||  || — || January 4, 2000 || Socorro || LINEAR || — || align=right | 2.0 km || 
|-id=643 bgcolor=#E9E9E9
| 75643 ||  || — || January 4, 2000 || Socorro || LINEAR || — || align=right | 2.4 km || 
|-id=644 bgcolor=#E9E9E9
| 75644 ||  || — || January 4, 2000 || Socorro || LINEAR || — || align=right | 5.9 km || 
|-id=645 bgcolor=#E9E9E9
| 75645 ||  || — || January 4, 2000 || Socorro || LINEAR || — || align=right | 2.6 km || 
|-id=646 bgcolor=#fefefe
| 75646 ||  || — || January 4, 2000 || Socorro || LINEAR || — || align=right | 2.1 km || 
|-id=647 bgcolor=#d6d6d6
| 75647 ||  || — || January 4, 2000 || Socorro || LINEAR || THB || align=right | 12 km || 
|-id=648 bgcolor=#E9E9E9
| 75648 ||  || — || January 4, 2000 || Socorro || LINEAR || — || align=right | 3.9 km || 
|-id=649 bgcolor=#fefefe
| 75649 ||  || — || January 4, 2000 || Socorro || LINEAR || PHO || align=right | 3.5 km || 
|-id=650 bgcolor=#E9E9E9
| 75650 ||  || — || January 4, 2000 || Socorro || LINEAR || — || align=right | 2.3 km || 
|-id=651 bgcolor=#E9E9E9
| 75651 ||  || — || January 4, 2000 || Socorro || LINEAR || — || align=right | 3.6 km || 
|-id=652 bgcolor=#E9E9E9
| 75652 ||  || — || January 4, 2000 || Socorro || LINEAR || — || align=right | 2.7 km || 
|-id=653 bgcolor=#fefefe
| 75653 ||  || — || January 4, 2000 || Socorro || LINEAR || — || align=right | 5.2 km || 
|-id=654 bgcolor=#E9E9E9
| 75654 ||  || — || January 4, 2000 || Socorro || LINEAR || — || align=right | 5.1 km || 
|-id=655 bgcolor=#E9E9E9
| 75655 ||  || — || January 4, 2000 || Socorro || LINEAR || DOR || align=right | 5.3 km || 
|-id=656 bgcolor=#fefefe
| 75656 ||  || — || January 5, 2000 || Socorro || LINEAR || — || align=right | 2.3 km || 
|-id=657 bgcolor=#fefefe
| 75657 ||  || — || January 5, 2000 || Socorro || LINEAR || NYS || align=right | 1.5 km || 
|-id=658 bgcolor=#fefefe
| 75658 ||  || — || January 5, 2000 || Socorro || LINEAR || V || align=right | 1.8 km || 
|-id=659 bgcolor=#E9E9E9
| 75659 ||  || — || January 5, 2000 || Socorro || LINEAR || — || align=right | 4.6 km || 
|-id=660 bgcolor=#fefefe
| 75660 ||  || — || January 5, 2000 || Socorro || LINEAR || — || align=right | 3.7 km || 
|-id=661 bgcolor=#fefefe
| 75661 ||  || — || January 5, 2000 || Socorro || LINEAR || — || align=right | 2.5 km || 
|-id=662 bgcolor=#E9E9E9
| 75662 ||  || — || January 5, 2000 || Socorro || LINEAR || — || align=right | 3.6 km || 
|-id=663 bgcolor=#E9E9E9
| 75663 ||  || — || January 5, 2000 || Socorro || LINEAR || — || align=right | 2.2 km || 
|-id=664 bgcolor=#E9E9E9
| 75664 ||  || — || January 5, 2000 || Socorro || LINEAR || — || align=right | 2.9 km || 
|-id=665 bgcolor=#E9E9E9
| 75665 ||  || — || January 5, 2000 || Socorro || LINEAR || — || align=right | 2.8 km || 
|-id=666 bgcolor=#fefefe
| 75666 ||  || — || January 5, 2000 || Socorro || LINEAR || — || align=right | 2.1 km || 
|-id=667 bgcolor=#E9E9E9
| 75667 ||  || — || January 5, 2000 || Socorro || LINEAR || — || align=right | 2.8 km || 
|-id=668 bgcolor=#d6d6d6
| 75668 ||  || — || January 5, 2000 || Socorro || LINEAR || KAR || align=right | 2.6 km || 
|-id=669 bgcolor=#fefefe
| 75669 ||  || — || January 5, 2000 || Socorro || LINEAR || NYS || align=right | 1.8 km || 
|-id=670 bgcolor=#E9E9E9
| 75670 ||  || — || January 5, 2000 || Socorro || LINEAR || — || align=right | 6.8 km || 
|-id=671 bgcolor=#E9E9E9
| 75671 ||  || — || January 5, 2000 || Socorro || LINEAR || MAR || align=right | 3.6 km || 
|-id=672 bgcolor=#E9E9E9
| 75672 ||  || — || January 5, 2000 || Socorro || LINEAR || — || align=right | 2.4 km || 
|-id=673 bgcolor=#E9E9E9
| 75673 ||  || — || January 4, 2000 || Socorro || LINEAR || — || align=right | 2.5 km || 
|-id=674 bgcolor=#E9E9E9
| 75674 ||  || — || January 4, 2000 || Socorro || LINEAR || — || align=right | 2.9 km || 
|-id=675 bgcolor=#E9E9E9
| 75675 ||  || — || January 4, 2000 || Socorro || LINEAR || MAR || align=right | 3.8 km || 
|-id=676 bgcolor=#E9E9E9
| 75676 ||  || — || January 4, 2000 || Socorro || LINEAR || — || align=right | 4.6 km || 
|-id=677 bgcolor=#E9E9E9
| 75677 ||  || — || January 4, 2000 || Socorro || LINEAR || BRU || align=right | 5.0 km || 
|-id=678 bgcolor=#fefefe
| 75678 ||  || — || January 4, 2000 || Socorro || LINEAR || V || align=right | 2.1 km || 
|-id=679 bgcolor=#E9E9E9
| 75679 ||  || — || January 4, 2000 || Socorro || LINEAR || — || align=right | 6.2 km || 
|-id=680 bgcolor=#E9E9E9
| 75680 ||  || — || January 4, 2000 || Socorro || LINEAR || — || align=right | 3.9 km || 
|-id=681 bgcolor=#fefefe
| 75681 ||  || — || January 4, 2000 || Socorro || LINEAR || — || align=right | 3.9 km || 
|-id=682 bgcolor=#fefefe
| 75682 ||  || — || January 5, 2000 || Socorro || LINEAR || FLO || align=right | 2.3 km || 
|-id=683 bgcolor=#fefefe
| 75683 ||  || — || January 5, 2000 || Socorro || LINEAR || NYS || align=right | 1.7 km || 
|-id=684 bgcolor=#fefefe
| 75684 ||  || — || January 5, 2000 || Socorro || LINEAR || V || align=right | 2.6 km || 
|-id=685 bgcolor=#E9E9E9
| 75685 ||  || — || January 5, 2000 || Socorro || LINEAR || — || align=right | 2.4 km || 
|-id=686 bgcolor=#fefefe
| 75686 ||  || — || January 5, 2000 || Socorro || LINEAR || — || align=right | 3.6 km || 
|-id=687 bgcolor=#fefefe
| 75687 ||  || — || January 5, 2000 || Socorro || LINEAR || — || align=right | 1.7 km || 
|-id=688 bgcolor=#fefefe
| 75688 ||  || — || January 5, 2000 || Socorro || LINEAR || — || align=right | 4.0 km || 
|-id=689 bgcolor=#fefefe
| 75689 ||  || — || January 5, 2000 || Socorro || LINEAR || — || align=right | 2.9 km || 
|-id=690 bgcolor=#fefefe
| 75690 ||  || — || January 5, 2000 || Socorro || LINEAR || — || align=right | 2.0 km || 
|-id=691 bgcolor=#fefefe
| 75691 ||  || — || January 5, 2000 || Socorro || LINEAR || V || align=right | 1.9 km || 
|-id=692 bgcolor=#E9E9E9
| 75692 ||  || — || January 5, 2000 || Socorro || LINEAR || — || align=right | 3.2 km || 
|-id=693 bgcolor=#E9E9E9
| 75693 ||  || — || January 5, 2000 || Socorro || LINEAR || — || align=right | 3.0 km || 
|-id=694 bgcolor=#fefefe
| 75694 ||  || — || January 5, 2000 || Socorro || LINEAR || — || align=right | 2.1 km || 
|-id=695 bgcolor=#fefefe
| 75695 ||  || — || January 5, 2000 || Socorro || LINEAR || — || align=right | 3.4 km || 
|-id=696 bgcolor=#E9E9E9
| 75696 ||  || — || January 5, 2000 || Socorro || LINEAR || — || align=right | 4.3 km || 
|-id=697 bgcolor=#E9E9E9
| 75697 ||  || — || January 5, 2000 || Socorro || LINEAR || MAR || align=right | 1.9 km || 
|-id=698 bgcolor=#fefefe
| 75698 ||  || — || January 5, 2000 || Socorro || LINEAR || — || align=right | 2.6 km || 
|-id=699 bgcolor=#E9E9E9
| 75699 ||  || — || January 5, 2000 || Socorro || LINEAR || — || align=right | 4.2 km || 
|-id=700 bgcolor=#E9E9E9
| 75700 ||  || — || January 5, 2000 || Socorro || LINEAR || JUN || align=right | 2.6 km || 
|}

75701–75800 

|-bgcolor=#E9E9E9
| 75701 ||  || — || January 5, 2000 || Socorro || LINEAR || — || align=right | 3.9 km || 
|-id=702 bgcolor=#E9E9E9
| 75702 ||  || — || January 5, 2000 || Socorro || LINEAR || — || align=right | 2.7 km || 
|-id=703 bgcolor=#fefefe
| 75703 ||  || — || January 5, 2000 || Socorro || LINEAR || V || align=right | 2.9 km || 
|-id=704 bgcolor=#fefefe
| 75704 ||  || — || January 5, 2000 || Socorro || LINEAR || — || align=right | 2.1 km || 
|-id=705 bgcolor=#E9E9E9
| 75705 ||  || — || January 5, 2000 || Socorro || LINEAR || — || align=right | 3.5 km || 
|-id=706 bgcolor=#fefefe
| 75706 ||  || — || January 5, 2000 || Socorro || LINEAR || — || align=right | 2.3 km || 
|-id=707 bgcolor=#E9E9E9
| 75707 ||  || — || January 5, 2000 || Socorro || LINEAR || MAR || align=right | 3.2 km || 
|-id=708 bgcolor=#E9E9E9
| 75708 ||  || — || January 5, 2000 || Socorro || LINEAR || — || align=right | 4.3 km || 
|-id=709 bgcolor=#E9E9E9
| 75709 ||  || — || January 5, 2000 || Socorro || LINEAR || — || align=right | 3.2 km || 
|-id=710 bgcolor=#E9E9E9
| 75710 ||  || — || January 5, 2000 || Socorro || LINEAR || KON || align=right | 5.9 km || 
|-id=711 bgcolor=#E9E9E9
| 75711 ||  || — || January 5, 2000 || Socorro || LINEAR || — || align=right | 3.1 km || 
|-id=712 bgcolor=#E9E9E9
| 75712 ||  || — || January 5, 2000 || Socorro || LINEAR || RAF || align=right | 4.0 km || 
|-id=713 bgcolor=#d6d6d6
| 75713 ||  || — || January 5, 2000 || Socorro || LINEAR || — || align=right | 12 km || 
|-id=714 bgcolor=#fefefe
| 75714 ||  || — || January 5, 2000 || Socorro || LINEAR || — || align=right | 3.0 km || 
|-id=715 bgcolor=#fefefe
| 75715 ||  || — || January 5, 2000 || Socorro || LINEAR || — || align=right | 2.2 km || 
|-id=716 bgcolor=#fefefe
| 75716 ||  || — || January 5, 2000 || Socorro || LINEAR || — || align=right | 2.2 km || 
|-id=717 bgcolor=#E9E9E9
| 75717 ||  || — || January 5, 2000 || Socorro || LINEAR || — || align=right | 4.8 km || 
|-id=718 bgcolor=#fefefe
| 75718 ||  || — || January 5, 2000 || Socorro || LINEAR || — || align=right | 3.5 km || 
|-id=719 bgcolor=#E9E9E9
| 75719 ||  || — || January 5, 2000 || Socorro || LINEAR || NEM || align=right | 4.4 km || 
|-id=720 bgcolor=#E9E9E9
| 75720 ||  || — || January 5, 2000 || Socorro || LINEAR || RAF || align=right | 4.2 km || 
|-id=721 bgcolor=#fefefe
| 75721 ||  || — || January 5, 2000 || Socorro || LINEAR || V || align=right | 2.1 km || 
|-id=722 bgcolor=#E9E9E9
| 75722 ||  || — || January 5, 2000 || Socorro || LINEAR || — || align=right | 2.4 km || 
|-id=723 bgcolor=#E9E9E9
| 75723 ||  || — || January 5, 2000 || Socorro || LINEAR || — || align=right | 3.2 km || 
|-id=724 bgcolor=#E9E9E9
| 75724 ||  || — || January 5, 2000 || Socorro || LINEAR || — || align=right | 3.6 km || 
|-id=725 bgcolor=#E9E9E9
| 75725 ||  || — || January 6, 2000 || Socorro || LINEAR || MIS || align=right | 6.3 km || 
|-id=726 bgcolor=#E9E9E9
| 75726 ||  || — || January 6, 2000 || Socorro || LINEAR || EUN || align=right | 3.0 km || 
|-id=727 bgcolor=#fefefe
| 75727 ||  || — || January 2, 2000 || Socorro || LINEAR || V || align=right | 1.8 km || 
|-id=728 bgcolor=#E9E9E9
| 75728 ||  || — || January 3, 2000 || Socorro || LINEAR || — || align=right | 2.1 km || 
|-id=729 bgcolor=#E9E9E9
| 75729 ||  || — || January 3, 2000 || Socorro || LINEAR || — || align=right | 3.0 km || 
|-id=730 bgcolor=#fefefe
| 75730 ||  || — || January 4, 2000 || Socorro || LINEAR || — || align=right | 2.2 km || 
|-id=731 bgcolor=#E9E9E9
| 75731 ||  || — || January 4, 2000 || Socorro || LINEAR || GEF || align=right | 2.6 km || 
|-id=732 bgcolor=#E9E9E9
| 75732 ||  || — || January 4, 2000 || Socorro || LINEAR || — || align=right | 1.7 km || 
|-id=733 bgcolor=#E9E9E9
| 75733 ||  || — || January 4, 2000 || Socorro || LINEAR || — || align=right | 2.9 km || 
|-id=734 bgcolor=#fefefe
| 75734 ||  || — || January 5, 2000 || Socorro || LINEAR || — || align=right | 3.1 km || 
|-id=735 bgcolor=#fefefe
| 75735 ||  || — || January 5, 2000 || Socorro || LINEAR || — || align=right | 2.2 km || 
|-id=736 bgcolor=#E9E9E9
| 75736 ||  || — || January 5, 2000 || Socorro || LINEAR || EUN || align=right | 3.0 km || 
|-id=737 bgcolor=#E9E9E9
| 75737 ||  || — || January 5, 2000 || Socorro || LINEAR || — || align=right | 7.2 km || 
|-id=738 bgcolor=#fefefe
| 75738 ||  || — || January 6, 2000 || Socorro || LINEAR || PHO || align=right | 3.1 km || 
|-id=739 bgcolor=#E9E9E9
| 75739 ||  || — || January 6, 2000 || Socorro || LINEAR || DOR || align=right | 7.7 km || 
|-id=740 bgcolor=#E9E9E9
| 75740 ||  || — || January 5, 2000 || Socorro || LINEAR || MAR || align=right | 2.4 km || 
|-id=741 bgcolor=#d6d6d6
| 75741 ||  || — || January 7, 2000 || Socorro || LINEAR || — || align=right | 5.8 km || 
|-id=742 bgcolor=#E9E9E9
| 75742 ||  || — || January 7, 2000 || Socorro || LINEAR || — || align=right | 2.7 km || 
|-id=743 bgcolor=#E9E9E9
| 75743 ||  || — || January 7, 2000 || Socorro || LINEAR || — || align=right | 4.4 km || 
|-id=744 bgcolor=#E9E9E9
| 75744 ||  || — || January 10, 2000 || Prescott || P. G. Comba || EUN || align=right | 3.1 km || 
|-id=745 bgcolor=#fefefe
| 75745 ||  || — || January 8, 2000 || Socorro || LINEAR || PHO || align=right | 3.1 km || 
|-id=746 bgcolor=#fefefe
| 75746 ||  || — || January 9, 2000 || Socorro || LINEAR || PHO || align=right | 3.7 km || 
|-id=747 bgcolor=#fefefe
| 75747 ||  || — || January 2, 2000 || Socorro || LINEAR || — || align=right | 2.2 km || 
|-id=748 bgcolor=#fefefe
| 75748 ||  || — || January 3, 2000 || Socorro || LINEAR || — || align=right | 2.3 km || 
|-id=749 bgcolor=#fefefe
| 75749 ||  || — || January 3, 2000 || Socorro || LINEAR || V || align=right | 1.6 km || 
|-id=750 bgcolor=#fefefe
| 75750 ||  || — || January 3, 2000 || Socorro || LINEAR || NYS || align=right | 1.5 km || 
|-id=751 bgcolor=#d6d6d6
| 75751 ||  || — || January 3, 2000 || Socorro || LINEAR || 628 || align=right | 5.7 km || 
|-id=752 bgcolor=#fefefe
| 75752 ||  || — || January 3, 2000 || Socorro || LINEAR || NYS || align=right | 1.7 km || 
|-id=753 bgcolor=#E9E9E9
| 75753 ||  || — || January 3, 2000 || Socorro || LINEAR || — || align=right | 6.2 km || 
|-id=754 bgcolor=#fefefe
| 75754 ||  || — || January 4, 2000 || Socorro || LINEAR || MAS || align=right | 1.7 km || 
|-id=755 bgcolor=#E9E9E9
| 75755 ||  || — || January 4, 2000 || Socorro || LINEAR || — || align=right | 2.1 km || 
|-id=756 bgcolor=#E9E9E9
| 75756 ||  || — || January 8, 2000 || Socorro || LINEAR || — || align=right | 3.6 km || 
|-id=757 bgcolor=#d6d6d6
| 75757 ||  || — || January 8, 2000 || Socorro || LINEAR || — || align=right | 13 km || 
|-id=758 bgcolor=#E9E9E9
| 75758 ||  || — || January 8, 2000 || Socorro || LINEAR || — || align=right | 3.3 km || 
|-id=759 bgcolor=#E9E9E9
| 75759 ||  || — || January 12, 2000 || Kleť || Kleť Obs. || — || align=right | 2.6 km || 
|-id=760 bgcolor=#E9E9E9
| 75760 ||  || — || January 12, 2000 || Prescott || P. G. Comba || WIT || align=right | 1.9 km || 
|-id=761 bgcolor=#fefefe
| 75761 ||  || — || January 7, 2000 || Socorro || LINEAR || V || align=right | 1.9 km || 
|-id=762 bgcolor=#E9E9E9
| 75762 ||  || — || January 7, 2000 || Socorro || LINEAR || MIT || align=right | 5.0 km || 
|-id=763 bgcolor=#E9E9E9
| 75763 ||  || — || January 7, 2000 || Socorro || LINEAR || EUN || align=right | 3.7 km || 
|-id=764 bgcolor=#E9E9E9
| 75764 ||  || — || January 7, 2000 || Socorro || LINEAR || EUN || align=right | 3.2 km || 
|-id=765 bgcolor=#fefefe
| 75765 ||  || — || January 7, 2000 || Socorro || LINEAR || — || align=right | 3.5 km || 
|-id=766 bgcolor=#E9E9E9
| 75766 ||  || — || January 7, 2000 || Socorro || LINEAR || EUN || align=right | 2.5 km || 
|-id=767 bgcolor=#d6d6d6
| 75767 ||  || — || January 7, 2000 || Socorro || LINEAR || — || align=right | 6.0 km || 
|-id=768 bgcolor=#E9E9E9
| 75768 ||  || — || January 8, 2000 || Socorro || LINEAR || — || align=right | 3.2 km || 
|-id=769 bgcolor=#E9E9E9
| 75769 ||  || — || January 8, 2000 || Socorro || LINEAR || — || align=right | 3.7 km || 
|-id=770 bgcolor=#E9E9E9
| 75770 ||  || — || January 8, 2000 || Socorro || LINEAR || EUN || align=right | 4.2 km || 
|-id=771 bgcolor=#E9E9E9
| 75771 ||  || — || January 8, 2000 || Socorro || LINEAR || — || align=right | 3.4 km || 
|-id=772 bgcolor=#E9E9E9
| 75772 ||  || — || January 8, 2000 || Socorro || LINEAR || EUN || align=right | 2.5 km || 
|-id=773 bgcolor=#E9E9E9
| 75773 ||  || — || January 8, 2000 || Socorro || LINEAR || MAR || align=right | 3.5 km || 
|-id=774 bgcolor=#E9E9E9
| 75774 ||  || — || January 8, 2000 || Socorro || LINEAR || — || align=right | 2.8 km || 
|-id=775 bgcolor=#E9E9E9
| 75775 ||  || — || January 8, 2000 || Socorro || LINEAR || — || align=right | 4.1 km || 
|-id=776 bgcolor=#E9E9E9
| 75776 ||  || — || January 8, 2000 || Socorro || LINEAR || — || align=right | 2.4 km || 
|-id=777 bgcolor=#E9E9E9
| 75777 ||  || — || January 8, 2000 || Socorro || LINEAR || WAT || align=right | 5.1 km || 
|-id=778 bgcolor=#d6d6d6
| 75778 ||  || — || January 8, 2000 || Socorro || LINEAR || — || align=right | 6.1 km || 
|-id=779 bgcolor=#E9E9E9
| 75779 ||  || — || January 9, 2000 || Socorro || LINEAR || — || align=right | 7.1 km || 
|-id=780 bgcolor=#E9E9E9
| 75780 ||  || — || January 10, 2000 || Socorro || LINEAR || — || align=right | 3.9 km || 
|-id=781 bgcolor=#d6d6d6
| 75781 ||  || — || January 10, 2000 || Socorro || LINEAR || ALA || align=right | 12 km || 
|-id=782 bgcolor=#E9E9E9
| 75782 ||  || — || January 10, 2000 || Socorro || LINEAR || — || align=right | 5.6 km || 
|-id=783 bgcolor=#E9E9E9
| 75783 ||  || — || January 10, 2000 || San Marcello || A. Boattini, V. Cecchini || HEN || align=right | 2.2 km || 
|-id=784 bgcolor=#E9E9E9
| 75784 ||  || — || January 15, 2000 || Višnjan Observatory || K. Korlević || PAD || align=right | 3.6 km || 
|-id=785 bgcolor=#E9E9E9
| 75785 ||  || — || January 15, 2000 || Višnjan Observatory || K. Korlević || — || align=right | 2.0 km || 
|-id=786 bgcolor=#E9E9E9
| 75786 ||  || — || January 3, 2000 || Kitt Peak || Spacewatch || — || align=right | 2.5 km || 
|-id=787 bgcolor=#E9E9E9
| 75787 ||  || — || January 5, 2000 || Kitt Peak || Spacewatch || MAR || align=right | 2.5 km || 
|-id=788 bgcolor=#E9E9E9
| 75788 ||  || — || January 6, 2000 || Kitt Peak || Spacewatch || — || align=right | 2.1 km || 
|-id=789 bgcolor=#E9E9E9
| 75789 ||  || — || January 7, 2000 || Kitt Peak || Spacewatch || — || align=right | 2.3 km || 
|-id=790 bgcolor=#E9E9E9
| 75790 ||  || — || January 8, 2000 || Kitt Peak || Spacewatch || — || align=right | 4.6 km || 
|-id=791 bgcolor=#E9E9E9
| 75791 ||  || — || January 8, 2000 || Kitt Peak || Spacewatch || — || align=right | 3.6 km || 
|-id=792 bgcolor=#fefefe
| 75792 ||  || — || January 11, 2000 || Kitt Peak || Spacewatch || EUT || align=right | 1.6 km || 
|-id=793 bgcolor=#E9E9E9
| 75793 ||  || — || January 12, 2000 || Kitt Peak || Spacewatch || — || align=right | 3.3 km || 
|-id=794 bgcolor=#E9E9E9
| 75794 ||  || — || January 10, 2000 || Kitt Peak || Spacewatch || HOF || align=right | 6.1 km || 
|-id=795 bgcolor=#E9E9E9
| 75795 ||  || — || January 3, 2000 || Socorro || LINEAR || — || align=right | 1.7 km || 
|-id=796 bgcolor=#E9E9E9
| 75796 ||  || — || January 3, 2000 || Socorro || LINEAR || GEF || align=right | 6.7 km || 
|-id=797 bgcolor=#E9E9E9
| 75797 ||  || — || January 4, 2000 || Socorro || LINEAR || — || align=right | 4.8 km || 
|-id=798 bgcolor=#fefefe
| 75798 ||  || — || January 4, 2000 || Socorro || LINEAR || V || align=right | 1.8 km || 
|-id=799 bgcolor=#E9E9E9
| 75799 ||  || — || January 4, 2000 || Socorro || LINEAR || — || align=right | 2.6 km || 
|-id=800 bgcolor=#fefefe
| 75800 ||  || — || January 4, 2000 || Socorro || LINEAR || NYS || align=right | 4.6 km || 
|}

75801–75900 

|-bgcolor=#E9E9E9
| 75801 ||  || — || January 4, 2000 || Socorro || LINEAR || MIT || align=right | 4.9 km || 
|-id=802 bgcolor=#E9E9E9
| 75802 ||  || — || January 5, 2000 || Socorro || LINEAR || — || align=right | 4.3 km || 
|-id=803 bgcolor=#E9E9E9
| 75803 ||  || — || January 5, 2000 || Socorro || LINEAR || — || align=right | 3.3 km || 
|-id=804 bgcolor=#E9E9E9
| 75804 ||  || — || January 5, 2000 || Anderson Mesa || LONEOS || EUN || align=right | 2.6 km || 
|-id=805 bgcolor=#d6d6d6
| 75805 ||  || — || January 5, 2000 || Kitt Peak || Spacewatch || EOS || align=right | 4.6 km || 
|-id=806 bgcolor=#E9E9E9
| 75806 ||  || — || January 6, 2000 || Višnjan Observatory || K. Korlević || — || align=right | 2.9 km || 
|-id=807 bgcolor=#E9E9E9
| 75807 ||  || — || January 6, 2000 || Socorro || LINEAR || — || align=right | 5.0 km || 
|-id=808 bgcolor=#E9E9E9
| 75808 ||  || — || January 7, 2000 || Anderson Mesa || LONEOS || — || align=right | 4.1 km || 
|-id=809 bgcolor=#E9E9E9
| 75809 ||  || — || January 7, 2000 || Anderson Mesa || LONEOS || CLO || align=right | 4.8 km || 
|-id=810 bgcolor=#fefefe
| 75810 ||  || — || January 8, 2000 || Socorro || LINEAR || — || align=right | 2.7 km || 
|-id=811 bgcolor=#E9E9E9
| 75811 ||  || — || January 8, 2000 || Socorro || LINEAR || — || align=right | 6.0 km || 
|-id=812 bgcolor=#E9E9E9
| 75812 || 2000 BF || — || January 16, 2000 || Višnjan Observatory || K. Korlević || — || align=right | 2.8 km || 
|-id=813 bgcolor=#E9E9E9
| 75813 ||  || — || January 27, 2000 || Oizumi || T. Kobayashi || — || align=right | 4.8 km || 
|-id=814 bgcolor=#E9E9E9
| 75814 ||  || — || January 27, 2000 || Oizumi || T. Kobayashi || EUN || align=right | 3.8 km || 
|-id=815 bgcolor=#E9E9E9
| 75815 ||  || — || January 28, 2000 || Socorro || LINEAR || — || align=right | 6.1 km || 
|-id=816 bgcolor=#E9E9E9
| 75816 ||  || — || January 28, 2000 || Socorro || LINEAR || ADE || align=right | 5.9 km || 
|-id=817 bgcolor=#fefefe
| 75817 ||  || — || January 29, 2000 || Socorro || LINEAR || V || align=right | 1.8 km || 
|-id=818 bgcolor=#d6d6d6
| 75818 ||  || — || January 29, 2000 || Socorro || LINEAR || — || align=right | 3.9 km || 
|-id=819 bgcolor=#E9E9E9
| 75819 ||  || — || January 29, 2000 || Socorro || LINEAR || MAR || align=right | 2.5 km || 
|-id=820 bgcolor=#d6d6d6
| 75820 ||  || — || January 26, 2000 || Kitt Peak || Spacewatch || — || align=right | 3.4 km || 
|-id=821 bgcolor=#E9E9E9
| 75821 ||  || — || January 28, 2000 || Kitt Peak || Spacewatch || — || align=right | 4.2 km || 
|-id=822 bgcolor=#E9E9E9
| 75822 ||  || — || January 31, 2000 || Oizumi || T. Kobayashi || — || align=right | 5.6 km || 
|-id=823 bgcolor=#d6d6d6
| 75823 Csokonai ||  ||  || January 28, 2000 || Piszkéstető || K. Sárneczky, L. Kiss || — || align=right | 7.4 km || 
|-id=824 bgcolor=#fefefe
| 75824 ||  || — || January 29, 2000 || Socorro || LINEAR || V || align=right | 1.9 km || 
|-id=825 bgcolor=#fefefe
| 75825 ||  || — || January 30, 2000 || Socorro || LINEAR || — || align=right | 2.5 km || 
|-id=826 bgcolor=#E9E9E9
| 75826 ||  || — || January 30, 2000 || Socorro || LINEAR || — || align=right | 5.1 km || 
|-id=827 bgcolor=#E9E9E9
| 75827 ||  || — || January 30, 2000 || Socorro || LINEAR || — || align=right | 6.1 km || 
|-id=828 bgcolor=#E9E9E9
| 75828 ||  || — || January 29, 2000 || Kitt Peak || Spacewatch || MAR || align=right | 2.5 km || 
|-id=829 bgcolor=#E9E9E9
| 75829 Alyea ||  ||  || January 30, 2000 || Catalina || CSS || — || align=right | 2.1 km || 
|-id=830 bgcolor=#E9E9E9
| 75830 ||  || — || January 29, 2000 || Socorro || LINEAR || — || align=right | 3.4 km || 
|-id=831 bgcolor=#E9E9E9
| 75831 ||  || — || January 30, 2000 || Socorro || LINEAR || — || align=right | 3.9 km || 
|-id=832 bgcolor=#E9E9E9
| 75832 ||  || — || January 30, 2000 || Socorro || LINEAR || — || align=right | 2.8 km || 
|-id=833 bgcolor=#E9E9E9
| 75833 ||  || — || January 30, 2000 || Socorro || LINEAR || — || align=right | 4.0 km || 
|-id=834 bgcolor=#E9E9E9
| 75834 ||  || — || January 30, 2000 || Socorro || LINEAR || — || align=right | 4.2 km || 
|-id=835 bgcolor=#d6d6d6
| 75835 ||  || — || January 30, 2000 || Socorro || LINEAR || 628 || align=right | 4.0 km || 
|-id=836 bgcolor=#E9E9E9
| 75836 Warrenastro ||  ||  || January 30, 2000 || Catalina || CSS || — || align=right | 2.5 km || 
|-id=837 bgcolor=#fefefe
| 75837 Johnbriol ||  ||  || January 30, 2000 || Catalina || CSS || — || align=right | 2.6 km || 
|-id=838 bgcolor=#E9E9E9
| 75838 ||  || — || January 30, 2000 || Socorro || LINEAR || — || align=right | 3.9 km || 
|-id=839 bgcolor=#E9E9E9
| 75839 ||  || — || January 30, 2000 || Socorro || LINEAR || — || align=right | 2.4 km || 
|-id=840 bgcolor=#fefefe
| 75840 ||  || — || January 30, 2000 || Socorro || LINEAR || NYS || align=right | 2.7 km || 
|-id=841 bgcolor=#E9E9E9
| 75841 Brendahuettner ||  ||  || January 30, 2000 || Catalina || CSS || — || align=right | 1.8 km || 
|-id=842 bgcolor=#E9E9E9
| 75842 Jackmonahan ||  ||  || January 30, 2000 || Catalina || CSS || XIZ || align=right | 3.1 km || 
|-id=843 bgcolor=#E9E9E9
| 75843 ||  || — || January 28, 2000 || Kitt Peak || Spacewatch || — || align=right | 3.5 km || 
|-id=844 bgcolor=#E9E9E9
| 75844 Rexadams ||  ||  || January 30, 2000 || Catalina || CSS || AGN || align=right | 2.6 km || 
|-id=845 bgcolor=#E9E9E9
| 75845 ||  || — || January 30, 2000 || Kitt Peak || Spacewatch || — || align=right | 1.6 km || 
|-id=846 bgcolor=#E9E9E9
| 75846 Jandorf ||  ||  || January 30, 2000 || Catalina || CSS || AGN || align=right | 2.5 km || 
|-id=847 bgcolor=#E9E9E9
| 75847 ||  || — || January 30, 2000 || Socorro || LINEAR || — || align=right | 3.8 km || 
|-id=848 bgcolor=#E9E9E9
| 75848 ||  || — || January 30, 2000 || Socorro || LINEAR || — || align=right | 2.5 km || 
|-id=849 bgcolor=#d6d6d6
| 75849 ||  || — || January 28, 2000 || Kitt Peak || Spacewatch || — || align=right | 4.3 km || 
|-id=850 bgcolor=#E9E9E9
| 75850 || 2000 CC || — || February 2, 2000 || Tebbutt || F. B. Zoltowski || — || align=right | 1.8 km || 
|-id=851 bgcolor=#d6d6d6
| 75851 || 2000 CF || — || February 1, 2000 || Prescott || P. G. Comba || — || align=right | 4.2 km || 
|-id=852 bgcolor=#E9E9E9
| 75852 Elgie || 2000 CY ||  || February 1, 2000 || Catalina || CSS || MAR || align=right | 4.0 km || 
|-id=853 bgcolor=#E9E9E9
| 75853 ||  || — || February 2, 2000 || Socorro || LINEAR || — || align=right | 5.1 km || 
|-id=854 bgcolor=#fefefe
| 75854 ||  || — || February 2, 2000 || Socorro || LINEAR || V || align=right | 1.8 km || 
|-id=855 bgcolor=#E9E9E9
| 75855 ||  || — || February 2, 2000 || Socorro || LINEAR || — || align=right | 4.6 km || 
|-id=856 bgcolor=#E9E9E9
| 75856 ||  || — || February 2, 2000 || Socorro || LINEAR || — || align=right | 2.2 km || 
|-id=857 bgcolor=#E9E9E9
| 75857 ||  || — || February 2, 2000 || Socorro || LINEAR || — || align=right | 3.3 km || 
|-id=858 bgcolor=#d6d6d6
| 75858 ||  || — || February 2, 2000 || Socorro || LINEAR || EOS || align=right | 3.5 km || 
|-id=859 bgcolor=#E9E9E9
| 75859 ||  || — || February 2, 2000 || Socorro || LINEAR || — || align=right | 3.3 km || 
|-id=860 bgcolor=#d6d6d6
| 75860 ||  || — || February 2, 2000 || Socorro || LINEAR || — || align=right | 4.8 km || 
|-id=861 bgcolor=#E9E9E9
| 75861 ||  || — || February 2, 2000 || Socorro || LINEAR || — || align=right | 1.6 km || 
|-id=862 bgcolor=#E9E9E9
| 75862 ||  || — || February 2, 2000 || Socorro || LINEAR || — || align=right | 6.2 km || 
|-id=863 bgcolor=#E9E9E9
| 75863 ||  || — || February 2, 2000 || Socorro || LINEAR || MRX || align=right | 2.5 km || 
|-id=864 bgcolor=#E9E9E9
| 75864 ||  || — || February 2, 2000 || Socorro || LINEAR || — || align=right | 1.9 km || 
|-id=865 bgcolor=#d6d6d6
| 75865 ||  || — || February 2, 2000 || Socorro || LINEAR || — || align=right | 5.2 km || 
|-id=866 bgcolor=#E9E9E9
| 75866 ||  || — || February 2, 2000 || Socorro || LINEAR || — || align=right | 4.8 km || 
|-id=867 bgcolor=#E9E9E9
| 75867 ||  || — || February 2, 2000 || Socorro || LINEAR || — || align=right | 3.1 km || 
|-id=868 bgcolor=#E9E9E9
| 75868 ||  || — || February 2, 2000 || Socorro || LINEAR || — || align=right | 3.3 km || 
|-id=869 bgcolor=#E9E9E9
| 75869 ||  || — || February 2, 2000 || Socorro || LINEAR || — || align=right | 2.4 km || 
|-id=870 bgcolor=#E9E9E9
| 75870 ||  || — || February 2, 2000 || Socorro || LINEAR || MRX || align=right | 3.0 km || 
|-id=871 bgcolor=#d6d6d6
| 75871 ||  || — || February 2, 2000 || Socorro || LINEAR || EOS || align=right | 4.9 km || 
|-id=872 bgcolor=#E9E9E9
| 75872 ||  || — || February 2, 2000 || Socorro || LINEAR || EUN || align=right | 5.4 km || 
|-id=873 bgcolor=#E9E9E9
| 75873 ||  || — || February 2, 2000 || Socorro || LINEAR || VIB || align=right | 4.9 km || 
|-id=874 bgcolor=#E9E9E9
| 75874 ||  || — || February 2, 2000 || Socorro || LINEAR || — || align=right | 2.6 km || 
|-id=875 bgcolor=#E9E9E9
| 75875 ||  || — || February 2, 2000 || Socorro || LINEAR || — || align=right | 2.9 km || 
|-id=876 bgcolor=#E9E9E9
| 75876 ||  || — || February 2, 2000 || Socorro || LINEAR || — || align=right | 1.9 km || 
|-id=877 bgcolor=#E9E9E9
| 75877 ||  || — || February 2, 2000 || Socorro || LINEAR || — || align=right | 2.3 km || 
|-id=878 bgcolor=#E9E9E9
| 75878 ||  || — || February 2, 2000 || Socorro || LINEAR || RAF || align=right | 2.7 km || 
|-id=879 bgcolor=#E9E9E9
| 75879 ||  || — || February 2, 2000 || Socorro || LINEAR || RAF || align=right | 2.1 km || 
|-id=880 bgcolor=#E9E9E9
| 75880 ||  || — || February 2, 2000 || Socorro || LINEAR || — || align=right | 4.8 km || 
|-id=881 bgcolor=#d6d6d6
| 75881 ||  || — || February 2, 2000 || Socorro || LINEAR || — || align=right | 8.0 km || 
|-id=882 bgcolor=#E9E9E9
| 75882 ||  || — || February 2, 2000 || Socorro || LINEAR || — || align=right | 3.8 km || 
|-id=883 bgcolor=#fefefe
| 75883 ||  || — || February 2, 2000 || Socorro || LINEAR || — || align=right | 5.2 km || 
|-id=884 bgcolor=#E9E9E9
| 75884 ||  || — || February 2, 2000 || Socorro || LINEAR || — || align=right | 5.5 km || 
|-id=885 bgcolor=#fefefe
| 75885 ||  || — || February 2, 2000 || Socorro || LINEAR || NYS || align=right | 1.4 km || 
|-id=886 bgcolor=#E9E9E9
| 75886 ||  || — || February 4, 2000 || Višnjan Observatory || K. Korlević || — || align=right | 3.3 km || 
|-id=887 bgcolor=#E9E9E9
| 75887 ||  || — || February 4, 2000 || San Marcello || M. Tombelli, L. Tesi || — || align=right | 2.4 km || 
|-id=888 bgcolor=#E9E9E9
| 75888 ||  || — || February 2, 2000 || Socorro || LINEAR || — || align=right | 5.0 km || 
|-id=889 bgcolor=#E9E9E9
| 75889 ||  || — || February 2, 2000 || Socorro || LINEAR || AGN || align=right | 2.1 km || 
|-id=890 bgcolor=#E9E9E9
| 75890 ||  || — || February 2, 2000 || Socorro || LINEAR || BRG || align=right | 3.3 km || 
|-id=891 bgcolor=#d6d6d6
| 75891 ||  || — || February 3, 2000 || Socorro || LINEAR || — || align=right | 6.3 km || 
|-id=892 bgcolor=#fefefe
| 75892 ||  || — || February 3, 2000 || Socorro || LINEAR || NYS || align=right | 2.3 km || 
|-id=893 bgcolor=#d6d6d6
| 75893 ||  || — || February 3, 2000 || Socorro || LINEAR || KOR || align=right | 3.5 km || 
|-id=894 bgcolor=#E9E9E9
| 75894 ||  || — || February 3, 2000 || Socorro || LINEAR || — || align=right | 1.9 km || 
|-id=895 bgcolor=#E9E9E9
| 75895 ||  || — || February 2, 2000 || Socorro || LINEAR || — || align=right | 6.3 km || 
|-id=896 bgcolor=#E9E9E9
| 75896 ||  || — || February 2, 2000 || Socorro || LINEAR || — || align=right | 2.0 km || 
|-id=897 bgcolor=#E9E9E9
| 75897 ||  || — || February 2, 2000 || Socorro || LINEAR || — || align=right | 8.8 km || 
|-id=898 bgcolor=#E9E9E9
| 75898 ||  || — || February 2, 2000 || Socorro || LINEAR || EUN || align=right | 2.9 km || 
|-id=899 bgcolor=#E9E9E9
| 75899 ||  || — || February 2, 2000 || Socorro || LINEAR || — || align=right | 2.5 km || 
|-id=900 bgcolor=#E9E9E9
| 75900 ||  || — || February 2, 2000 || Socorro || LINEAR || — || align=right | 2.7 km || 
|}

75901–76000 

|-bgcolor=#E9E9E9
| 75901 ||  || — || February 2, 2000 || Socorro || LINEAR || — || align=right | 3.1 km || 
|-id=902 bgcolor=#E9E9E9
| 75902 ||  || — || February 2, 2000 || Socorro || LINEAR || MRX || align=right | 3.5 km || 
|-id=903 bgcolor=#E9E9E9
| 75903 ||  || — || February 2, 2000 || Socorro || LINEAR || slow || align=right | 6.9 km || 
|-id=904 bgcolor=#E9E9E9
| 75904 ||  || — || February 2, 2000 || Socorro || LINEAR || — || align=right | 6.5 km || 
|-id=905 bgcolor=#E9E9E9
| 75905 ||  || — || February 2, 2000 || Socorro || LINEAR || — || align=right | 6.2 km || 
|-id=906 bgcolor=#E9E9E9
| 75906 ||  || — || February 2, 2000 || Socorro || LINEAR || — || align=right | 3.4 km || 
|-id=907 bgcolor=#E9E9E9
| 75907 ||  || — || February 2, 2000 || Socorro || LINEAR || — || align=right | 3.8 km || 
|-id=908 bgcolor=#E9E9E9
| 75908 ||  || — || February 2, 2000 || Socorro || LINEAR || EUN || align=right | 3.0 km || 
|-id=909 bgcolor=#E9E9E9
| 75909 ||  || — || February 2, 2000 || Socorro || LINEAR || — || align=right | 2.6 km || 
|-id=910 bgcolor=#d6d6d6
| 75910 ||  || — || February 2, 2000 || Socorro || LINEAR || fast || align=right | 11 km || 
|-id=911 bgcolor=#E9E9E9
| 75911 ||  || — || February 2, 2000 || Socorro || LINEAR || — || align=right | 1.9 km || 
|-id=912 bgcolor=#E9E9E9
| 75912 ||  || — || February 4, 2000 || Socorro || LINEAR || GEF || align=right | 2.1 km || 
|-id=913 bgcolor=#E9E9E9
| 75913 ||  || — || February 5, 2000 || Socorro || LINEAR || — || align=right | 3.1 km || 
|-id=914 bgcolor=#E9E9E9
| 75914 ||  || — || February 2, 2000 || Socorro || LINEAR || BAR || align=right | 3.0 km || 
|-id=915 bgcolor=#d6d6d6
| 75915 ||  || — || February 2, 2000 || Socorro || LINEAR || KOR || align=right | 3.4 km || 
|-id=916 bgcolor=#E9E9E9
| 75916 ||  || — || February 2, 2000 || Socorro || LINEAR || MAR || align=right | 2.7 km || 
|-id=917 bgcolor=#E9E9E9
| 75917 ||  || — || February 2, 2000 || Socorro || LINEAR || — || align=right | 2.4 km || 
|-id=918 bgcolor=#d6d6d6
| 75918 ||  || — || February 2, 2000 || Socorro || LINEAR || — || align=right | 9.7 km || 
|-id=919 bgcolor=#E9E9E9
| 75919 ||  || — || February 2, 2000 || Socorro || LINEAR || — || align=right | 9.7 km || 
|-id=920 bgcolor=#E9E9E9
| 75920 ||  || — || February 2, 2000 || Socorro || LINEAR || MAR || align=right | 3.1 km || 
|-id=921 bgcolor=#E9E9E9
| 75921 ||  || — || February 2, 2000 || Socorro || LINEAR || — || align=right | 3.4 km || 
|-id=922 bgcolor=#E9E9E9
| 75922 ||  || — || February 3, 2000 || Socorro || LINEAR || — || align=right | 4.8 km || 
|-id=923 bgcolor=#E9E9E9
| 75923 ||  || — || February 4, 2000 || Socorro || LINEAR || — || align=right | 3.9 km || 
|-id=924 bgcolor=#E9E9E9
| 75924 ||  || — || February 6, 2000 || Socorro || LINEAR || — || align=right | 4.2 km || 
|-id=925 bgcolor=#d6d6d6
| 75925 ||  || — || February 6, 2000 || Socorro || LINEAR || — || align=right | 4.3 km || 
|-id=926 bgcolor=#E9E9E9
| 75926 ||  || — || February 6, 2000 || Socorro || LINEAR || — || align=right | 1.5 km || 
|-id=927 bgcolor=#d6d6d6
| 75927 ||  || — || February 6, 2000 || Socorro || LINEAR || BRA || align=right | 3.2 km || 
|-id=928 bgcolor=#E9E9E9
| 75928 ||  || — || February 1, 2000 || Kitt Peak || Spacewatch || — || align=right | 3.6 km || 
|-id=929 bgcolor=#E9E9E9
| 75929 ||  || — || February 7, 2000 || Socorro || LINEAR || — || align=right | 3.4 km || 
|-id=930 bgcolor=#E9E9E9
| 75930 ||  || — || February 7, 2000 || Socorro || LINEAR || — || align=right | 4.0 km || 
|-id=931 bgcolor=#E9E9E9
| 75931 ||  || — || February 7, 2000 || Socorro || LINEAR || — || align=right | 3.5 km || 
|-id=932 bgcolor=#d6d6d6
| 75932 ||  || — || February 7, 2000 || Socorro || LINEAR || — || align=right | 7.0 km || 
|-id=933 bgcolor=#FA8072
| 75933 ||  || — || February 6, 2000 || Socorro || LINEAR || — || align=right | 4.0 km || 
|-id=934 bgcolor=#E9E9E9
| 75934 ||  || — || February 7, 2000 || Socorro || LINEAR || — || align=right | 4.0 km || 
|-id=935 bgcolor=#E9E9E9
| 75935 ||  || — || February 7, 2000 || Socorro || LINEAR || — || align=right | 3.0 km || 
|-id=936 bgcolor=#d6d6d6
| 75936 ||  || — || February 8, 2000 || Socorro || LINEAR || — || align=right | 4.6 km || 
|-id=937 bgcolor=#E9E9E9
| 75937 ||  || — || February 7, 2000 || Kitt Peak || Spacewatch || — || align=right | 3.5 km || 
|-id=938 bgcolor=#E9E9E9
| 75938 ||  || — || February 6, 2000 || Socorro || LINEAR || — || align=right | 5.7 km || 
|-id=939 bgcolor=#d6d6d6
| 75939 ||  || — || February 4, 2000 || Socorro || LINEAR || — || align=right | 7.4 km || 
|-id=940 bgcolor=#d6d6d6
| 75940 ||  || — || February 4, 2000 || Socorro || LINEAR || — || align=right | 2.7 km || 
|-id=941 bgcolor=#E9E9E9
| 75941 ||  || — || February 4, 2000 || Socorro || LINEAR || MIS || align=right | 6.2 km || 
|-id=942 bgcolor=#d6d6d6
| 75942 ||  || — || February 4, 2000 || Socorro || LINEAR || — || align=right | 3.9 km || 
|-id=943 bgcolor=#E9E9E9
| 75943 ||  || — || February 4, 2000 || Socorro || LINEAR || — || align=right | 3.4 km || 
|-id=944 bgcolor=#E9E9E9
| 75944 ||  || — || February 4, 2000 || Socorro || LINEAR || — || align=right | 2.5 km || 
|-id=945 bgcolor=#E9E9E9
| 75945 ||  || — || February 4, 2000 || Socorro || LINEAR || — || align=right | 3.1 km || 
|-id=946 bgcolor=#E9E9E9
| 75946 ||  || — || February 4, 2000 || Socorro || LINEAR || MAR || align=right | 3.2 km || 
|-id=947 bgcolor=#E9E9E9
| 75947 ||  || — || February 4, 2000 || Socorro || LINEAR || — || align=right | 7.5 km || 
|-id=948 bgcolor=#E9E9E9
| 75948 ||  || — || February 4, 2000 || Socorro || LINEAR || — || align=right | 5.3 km || 
|-id=949 bgcolor=#d6d6d6
| 75949 ||  || — || February 4, 2000 || Socorro || LINEAR || URS || align=right | 7.0 km || 
|-id=950 bgcolor=#E9E9E9
| 75950 ||  || — || February 4, 2000 || Socorro || LINEAR || — || align=right | 2.2 km || 
|-id=951 bgcolor=#E9E9E9
| 75951 ||  || — || February 6, 2000 || Socorro || LINEAR || — || align=right | 7.1 km || 
|-id=952 bgcolor=#E9E9E9
| 75952 ||  || — || February 6, 2000 || Socorro || LINEAR || — || align=right | 3.4 km || 
|-id=953 bgcolor=#E9E9E9
| 75953 ||  || — || February 6, 2000 || Socorro || LINEAR || HEN || align=right | 4.1 km || 
|-id=954 bgcolor=#E9E9E9
| 75954 ||  || — || February 6, 2000 || Socorro || LINEAR || EUN || align=right | 3.5 km || 
|-id=955 bgcolor=#E9E9E9
| 75955 ||  || — || February 6, 2000 || Socorro || LINEAR || — || align=right | 6.9 km || 
|-id=956 bgcolor=#E9E9E9
| 75956 ||  || — || February 6, 2000 || Socorro || LINEAR || — || align=right | 2.4 km || 
|-id=957 bgcolor=#E9E9E9
| 75957 ||  || — || February 8, 2000 || Socorro || LINEAR || ADE || align=right | 6.1 km || 
|-id=958 bgcolor=#E9E9E9
| 75958 ||  || — || February 8, 2000 || Socorro || LINEAR || — || align=right | 5.7 km || 
|-id=959 bgcolor=#E9E9E9
| 75959 ||  || — || February 8, 2000 || Socorro || LINEAR || EUN || align=right | 3.2 km || 
|-id=960 bgcolor=#E9E9E9
| 75960 ||  || — || February 6, 2000 || Socorro || LINEAR || — || align=right | 4.4 km || 
|-id=961 bgcolor=#d6d6d6
| 75961 ||  || — || February 8, 2000 || Kitt Peak || Spacewatch || — || align=right | 7.1 km || 
|-id=962 bgcolor=#E9E9E9
| 75962 ||  || — || February 10, 2000 || Kitt Peak || Spacewatch || — || align=right | 2.7 km || 
|-id=963 bgcolor=#E9E9E9
| 75963 ||  || — || February 10, 2000 || Kitt Peak || Spacewatch || — || align=right | 3.4 km || 
|-id=964 bgcolor=#E9E9E9
| 75964 ||  || — || February 10, 2000 || Kitt Peak || Spacewatch || MAR || align=right | 2.3 km || 
|-id=965 bgcolor=#E9E9E9
| 75965 ||  || — || February 6, 2000 || Socorro || LINEAR || — || align=right | 4.9 km || 
|-id=966 bgcolor=#E9E9E9
| 75966 ||  || — || February 7, 2000 || Socorro || LINEAR || — || align=right | 2.5 km || 
|-id=967 bgcolor=#E9E9E9
| 75967 ||  || — || February 8, 2000 || Socorro || LINEAR || — || align=right | 3.9 km || 
|-id=968 bgcolor=#d6d6d6
| 75968 ||  || — || February 10, 2000 || Višnjan Observatory || K. Korlević || THM || align=right | 7.4 km || 
|-id=969 bgcolor=#d6d6d6
| 75969 Backhouse ||  ||  || February 7, 2000 || Catalina || CSS || — || align=right | 6.1 km || 
|-id=970 bgcolor=#E9E9E9
| 75970 Olcott ||  ||  || February 7, 2000 || Catalina || CSS || — || align=right | 2.9 km || 
|-id=971 bgcolor=#E9E9E9
| 75971 Unkingalls ||  ||  || February 7, 2000 || Catalina || CSS || — || align=right | 5.2 km || 
|-id=972 bgcolor=#d6d6d6
| 75972 Huddleston ||  ||  || February 7, 2000 || Catalina || CSS || LIX || align=right | 6.7 km || 
|-id=973 bgcolor=#E9E9E9
| 75973 ||  || — || February 3, 2000 || Socorro || LINEAR || — || align=right | 3.3 km || 
|-id=974 bgcolor=#E9E9E9
| 75974 ||  || — || February 4, 2000 || Socorro || LINEAR || AST || align=right | 6.1 km || 
|-id=975 bgcolor=#E9E9E9
| 75975 ||  || — || February 2, 2000 || Socorro || LINEAR || — || align=right | 3.8 km || 
|-id=976 bgcolor=#E9E9E9
| 75976 ||  || — || February 3, 2000 || Socorro || LINEAR || — || align=right | 6.4 km || 
|-id=977 bgcolor=#E9E9E9
| 75977 ||  || — || February 3, 2000 || Socorro || LINEAR || — || align=right | 3.6 km || 
|-id=978 bgcolor=#E9E9E9
| 75978 ||  || — || February 3, 2000 || Socorro || LINEAR || — || align=right | 4.7 km || 
|-id=979 bgcolor=#d6d6d6
| 75979 ||  || — || February 3, 2000 || Socorro || LINEAR || KOR || align=right | 3.9 km || 
|-id=980 bgcolor=#d6d6d6
| 75980 ||  || — || February 2, 2000 || Kitt Peak || Spacewatch || HYG || align=right | 5.1 km || 
|-id=981 bgcolor=#d6d6d6
| 75981 ||  || — || February 3, 2000 || Kitt Peak || Spacewatch || — || align=right | 3.3 km || 
|-id=982 bgcolor=#d6d6d6
| 75982 || 2000 DU || — || February 24, 2000 || Oizumi || T. Kobayashi || — || align=right | 5.0 km || 
|-id=983 bgcolor=#E9E9E9
| 75983 || 2000 DY || — || February 24, 2000 || Oizumi || T. Kobayashi || — || align=right | 6.6 km || 
|-id=984 bgcolor=#d6d6d6
| 75984 ||  || — || February 26, 2000 || Kitt Peak || Spacewatch || — || align=right | 3.2 km || 
|-id=985 bgcolor=#d6d6d6
| 75985 ||  || — || February 24, 2000 || Oizumi || T. Kobayashi || EOS || align=right | 4.7 km || 
|-id=986 bgcolor=#d6d6d6
| 75986 ||  || — || February 28, 2000 || Višnjan Observatory || K. Korlević, M. Jurić || — || align=right | 4.1 km || 
|-id=987 bgcolor=#E9E9E9
| 75987 ||  || — || February 28, 2000 || Socorro || LINEAR || — || align=right | 2.1 km || 
|-id=988 bgcolor=#E9E9E9
| 75988 ||  || — || February 28, 2000 || Socorro || LINEAR || MAR || align=right | 2.2 km || 
|-id=989 bgcolor=#d6d6d6
| 75989 ||  || — || February 29, 2000 || Oizumi || T. Kobayashi || EOS || align=right | 5.8 km || 
|-id=990 bgcolor=#E9E9E9
| 75990 ||  || — || February 26, 2000 || Kitt Peak || Spacewatch || WIT || align=right | 2.2 km || 
|-id=991 bgcolor=#d6d6d6
| 75991 ||  || — || February 26, 2000 || Kitt Peak || Spacewatch || — || align=right | 5.1 km || 
|-id=992 bgcolor=#E9E9E9
| 75992 ||  || — || February 26, 2000 || Kitt Peak || Spacewatch || EUN || align=right | 2.2 km || 
|-id=993 bgcolor=#E9E9E9
| 75993 ||  || — || February 26, 2000 || Kitt Peak || Spacewatch || — || align=right | 2.9 km || 
|-id=994 bgcolor=#d6d6d6
| 75994 ||  || — || February 27, 2000 || Kitt Peak || Spacewatch || HYG || align=right | 6.8 km || 
|-id=995 bgcolor=#E9E9E9
| 75995 ||  || — || February 28, 2000 || Kitt Peak || Spacewatch || — || align=right | 1.9 km || 
|-id=996 bgcolor=#E9E9E9
| 75996 Piekiel ||  ||  || February 26, 2000 || Catalina || CSS || — || align=right | 3.7 km || 
|-id=997 bgcolor=#E9E9E9
| 75997 ||  || — || February 26, 2000 || Catalina || CSS || — || align=right | 3.1 km || 
|-id=998 bgcolor=#E9E9E9
| 75998 ||  || — || February 26, 2000 || Catalina || CSS || — || align=right | 4.3 km || 
|-id=999 bgcolor=#E9E9E9
| 75999 ||  || — || February 26, 2000 || Catalina || CSS || — || align=right | 7.2 km || 
|-id=000 bgcolor=#E9E9E9
| 76000 Juliuserving ||  ||  || February 26, 2000 || Catalina || CSS || — || align=right | 4.0 km || 
|}

References

External links 
 Discovery Circumstances: Numbered Minor Planets (75001)–(80000) (IAU Minor Planet Center)

0075